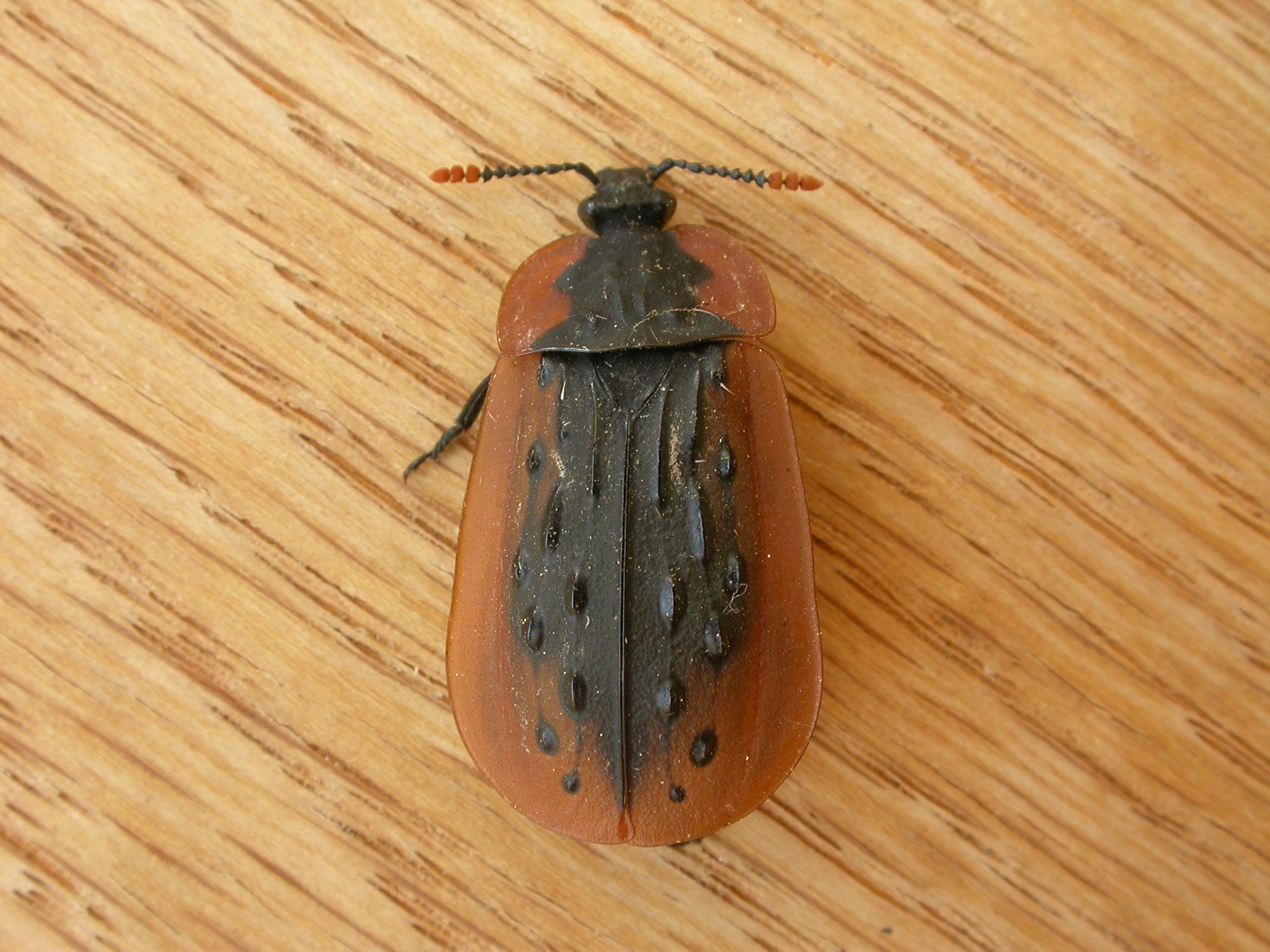
- P. lacrymosa in Aranda, Australia
- P. perlata in Coffs Harbor, Australia

Scientific classification
- Kingdom: Animalia
- Phylum: Arthropoda
- Clade: Pancrustacea
- Class: Insecta
- Order: Coleoptera
- Suborder: Polyphaga
- Infraorder: Staphyliniformia
- Family: Staphylinidae
- Tribe: Silphini
- Genus: Ptomaphila; Kirby & Spence, 1828

Type species
- Silpha lacrymosa Schreibers, 1802

Species
- P. lacrymosa (Schreibers, 1802); P. ovata Portevin, 1926; P. perlata Kraatz, 1876

= Ptomaphila =

Genus of beetles

Ptomaphila is a genus of carrion beetles in the tribe Silphini. It includes three species, two of which are endemic to Australia and one which is endemic to New Guinea.

== Taxonomy and phylogeny ==
The genus Ptomaphila was erected in 1828 by English entomologists William Kirby and William Spence with Silpha lacrymosa, described by Carl Franz Anton Ritter von Schreibers in 1802, as the type and sole species. Louis Agassiz attempted to emend the name to Ptomatophila in 1847, however, this is considered an unjustified emendation under the International Code for Zoological Nomenclature. A second species in the genus, Ptomaphila perlata, was described by German entomologist Ernst Gustav Kraatz in 1876 and a third, Ptomaphila ovata, was described by French entomologist Gaston Portevin in 1926.

Ptomaphila is regarded as a sister genus to the South American silphid genus Oxelytrum. Phylogenetic analysis has found the two to form a basal monophyletic clade within the tribe Silphini, suggesting a shared Gondwanan origin. Within the genus, P. ovata is considered the most plesiomorphic and P. larcymosa the most derived, with P. lacrymosa and P. perlata being sister species.

== Distribution and ecology ==
The genus Ptomaphila is known only from Australia and New Guinea. Two species, P. lacrymosa and P. perlata, are endemic to Australia, while P. ovata is endemic to New Guinea. Of the Australian species, P. lacrymosa is restricted to the southern half of the continent, including Tasmania, while P. perlata is restricted to eastern Australia and Lord Howe Island. In areas where the two Australian species overlap, they are known to occur in the same local habitats. The New Guinea species P. ovata is found in both West Papua and Papua New Guinea, but occurs only in montane rainforests.

Ptomaphila species are necrophages known to feed on large carrion, dead insects, and maggots on carcasses. The larvae have been recorded later in the decomposition process than adult beetles and feed mostly on carrion.

== Description ==
Adult Ptomaphila are large, flattened brown and yellow-orange beetles with raised longitudinal ridges and tubercles on the elytra. The antennae have eleven clearly defined segments and the lateral margins of the pronotum are flattened. In Ptomaphila lacrymosa and P. perlata the last three antennal segments are yellow-orange, while in P. ovata only the terminal antennal segment is yellow-orange.

The larvae of all Ptomaphila species are undescribed and cannot be visually differentiated.

== Species ==
The genus Ptomaphila includes the following species:

- Ptomaphila lacrymosa (Schreibers, 1802) – southern Australia
- Ptomaphila ovata Portevin, 1926 – New Guinea
- Ptomaphila perlata Kraatz, 1876 – eastern Australia
