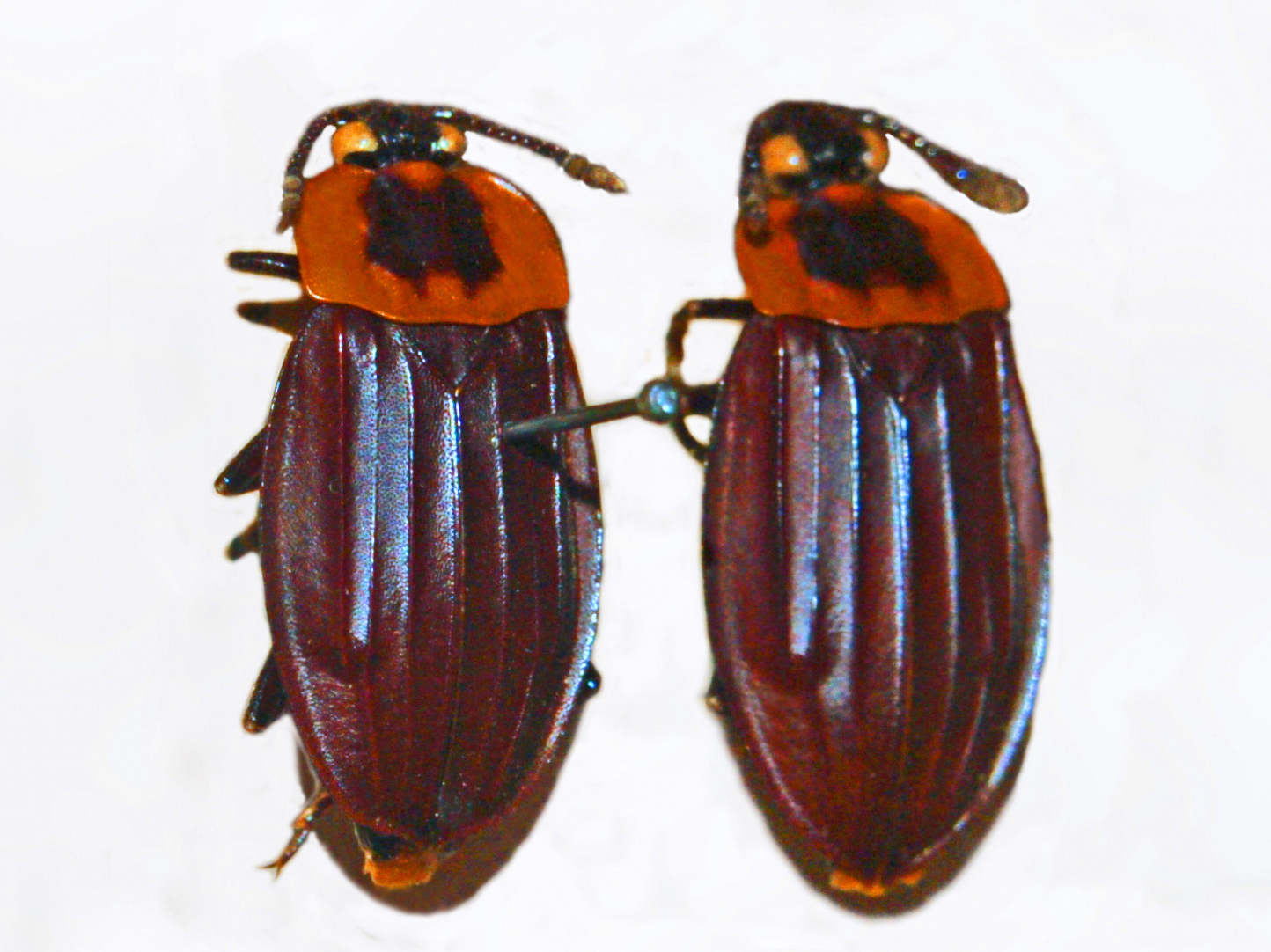
- Oxelytrum cayennense from Venezuela. Mounted specimen on display at Museo Civico di Storia Naturale di Genova

Scientific classification
- Kingdom: Animalia
- Phylum: Arthropoda
- Clade: Pancrustacea
- Class: Insecta
- Order: Coleoptera
- Suborder: Polyphaga
- Infraorder: Staphyliniformia
- Family: Staphylinidae
- Genus: Oxelytrum
- Species: O. cayennense

Binomial name
- Oxelytrum cayennense (Stürm, 1826)

= Oxelytrum cayennense =

Species of beetle

Oxelytrum cayennense is a species of carrion beetles belonging to the family Silphidae.

== Description ==
Oxelytrum cayennense can reach a length of about 13–19 millimetres (0.51–0.75 in). They have three ridges on each elytron, without hairs on the pronotal disk and without a tooth or only with a small protuberance in the humeral region of the elytra. Elytra are black, with pointed apices. Head has prominent eyes and antennae with a 3-segmented antennal club. Pronotum usually shows a uniform orange-red or yellow color, but often a dark maculae, almost rounded or a little quadrangular-shaped, occupies the center of the pronotal disk.

These carrion beetles are nocturnal. They are commonly associated with decomposing carcasses of animals. Adults feed both on soft tissues of carcasses and on larvae and eggs of flies, while the larvae are strictly scavengers.

== Distribution and habitat ==
This species is present in most of northern and central South America (Bolivia, Brazil, Colombia, Ecuador, French Guiana, Peru, Venezuela). It can be found in lower to middle elevation rain forest habitats.
