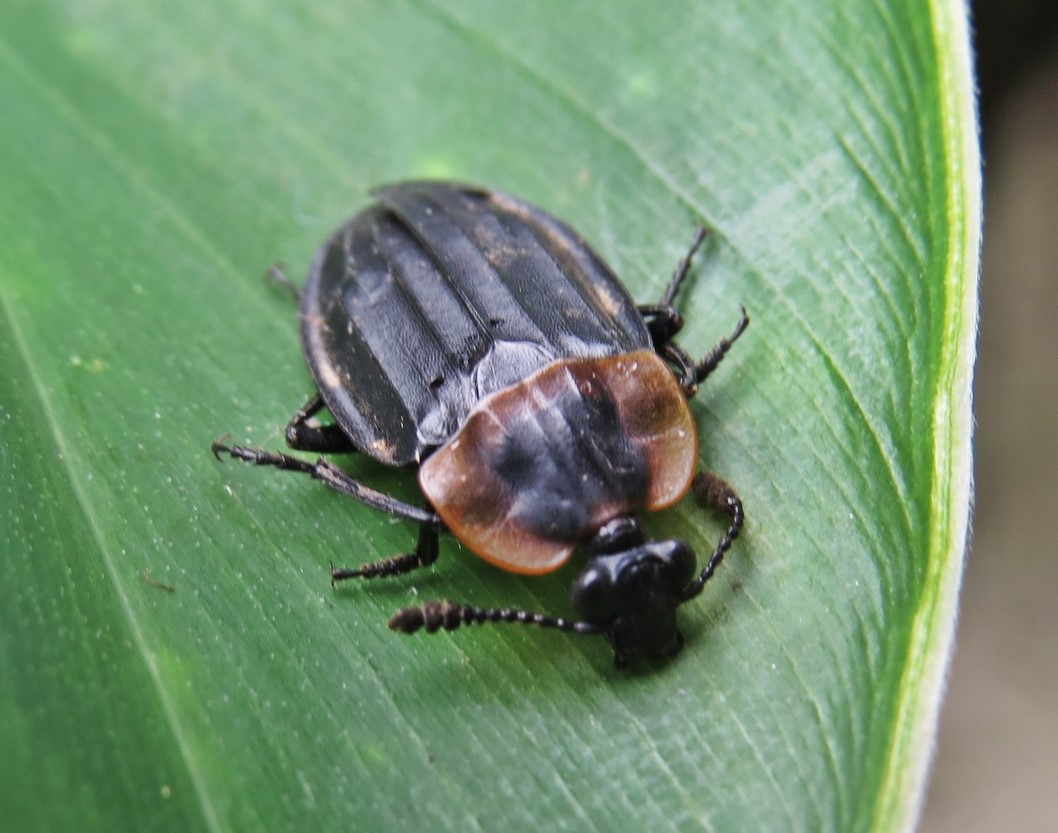

Scientific classification
- Kingdom: Animalia
- Phylum: Arthropoda
- Clade: Pancrustacea
- Class: Insecta
- Order: Coleoptera
- Suborder: Polyphaga
- Infraorder: Staphyliniformia
- Family: Staphylinidae
- Genus: Oxelytrum
- Species: O. discicolle

Binomial name
- Oxelytrum discicolle (Brullé, 1836)

= Oxelytrum discicolle =

Species of beetle

Oxelytrum discicolle is a species of carrion beetle in the family Silphidae. It is found in Central America, North America, and South America.
