= Dendroxena quadrimaculata =

Scientific classification
- Kingdom: Animalia
- Phylum: Arthropoda
- Clade: Pancrustacea
- Class: Insecta
- Order: Coleoptera
- Suborder: Polyphaga
- Infraorder: Staphyliniformia
- Family: Staphylinidae
- Genus: Dendroxena
- Species: D. quadrimaculata

Binomial name
- Dendroxena quadrimaculata (Scopoli, 1771)

Synonyms
- Silpha quadripunctata Schreber, 1759; Xylodrepa quadripunctata Linnaeus, 1761; Silphia flavicans Goeze, 1777; Peltis maculata Geoffroy, 1785; Silpha hexapunctata Gerhardt, 1897; Silpha schreberi Pope, 1965

Species of beetle

Dendroxena quadrimaculata, commonly known as Four-spotted carrion beetle, is a species of beetle belonging to the family Silphidae.

== Description ==
The adult Dendroxena quadrimaculata has a flat, oblong body that reaches up to 12–14 mm (0.47–0.55 in) in length. It has a light brown body, with elytra that have four black spots arranged in a square formation. A rarer form, hexapunctata, has additional black pigment on each end of the elytra. The scutellum, head, antennae and legs are black, and it has a black central pronotal marking.

== Distribution ==
The species is found across Europe, extending eastwards to western Siberia and northward into Scandinavia. As of 2019, it is considered to be extinct in Finland. Within its range, it is most commonly found in oak forests, particularly at lower elevations, from April through June.

== Behavior and ecology ==
Unlike most carrion beetle species, imagines actively hunt for sawfly larvae, caterpillars and aphids. Eggs are laid individually in the ground, and the resulting black larvae can reach up to 20 mm (0.79 in). Similarly, they live a predatory lifestyle and, like their name implies, feed on carrion. Larvae pupate in the year they hatched and, after spending the winter hibernating in the soil, emerge in April of the following year.
