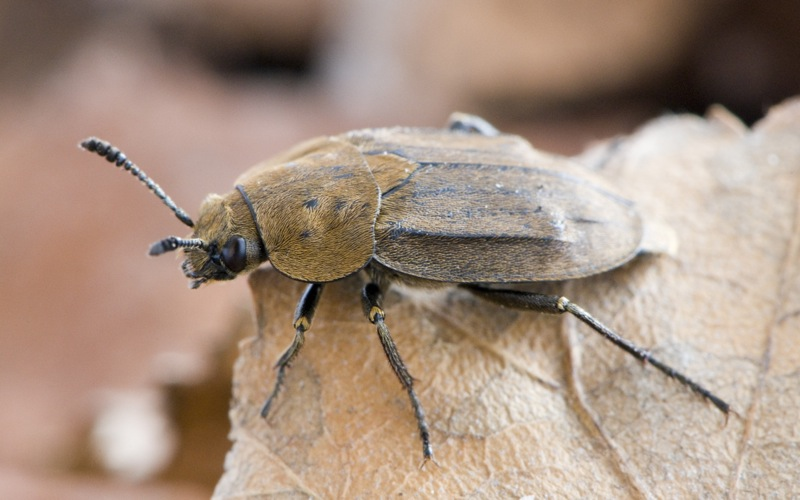

Scientific classification
- Kingdom: Animalia
- Phylum: Arthropoda
- Clade: Pancrustacea
- Class: Insecta
- Order: Coleoptera
- Suborder: Polyphaga
- Infraorder: Staphyliniformia
- Family: Staphylinidae
- Genus: Aclypea
- Species: A. opaca

Binomial name
- Aclypea opaca (Linnaeus, 1758)

= Aclypea opaca =

Species of beetle

Aclypea opaca, commonly known as the dark carrion beetle, is a species of carrion beetle in the family Silphidae. It is found in Europe and Northern Asia (excluding China) and North America.

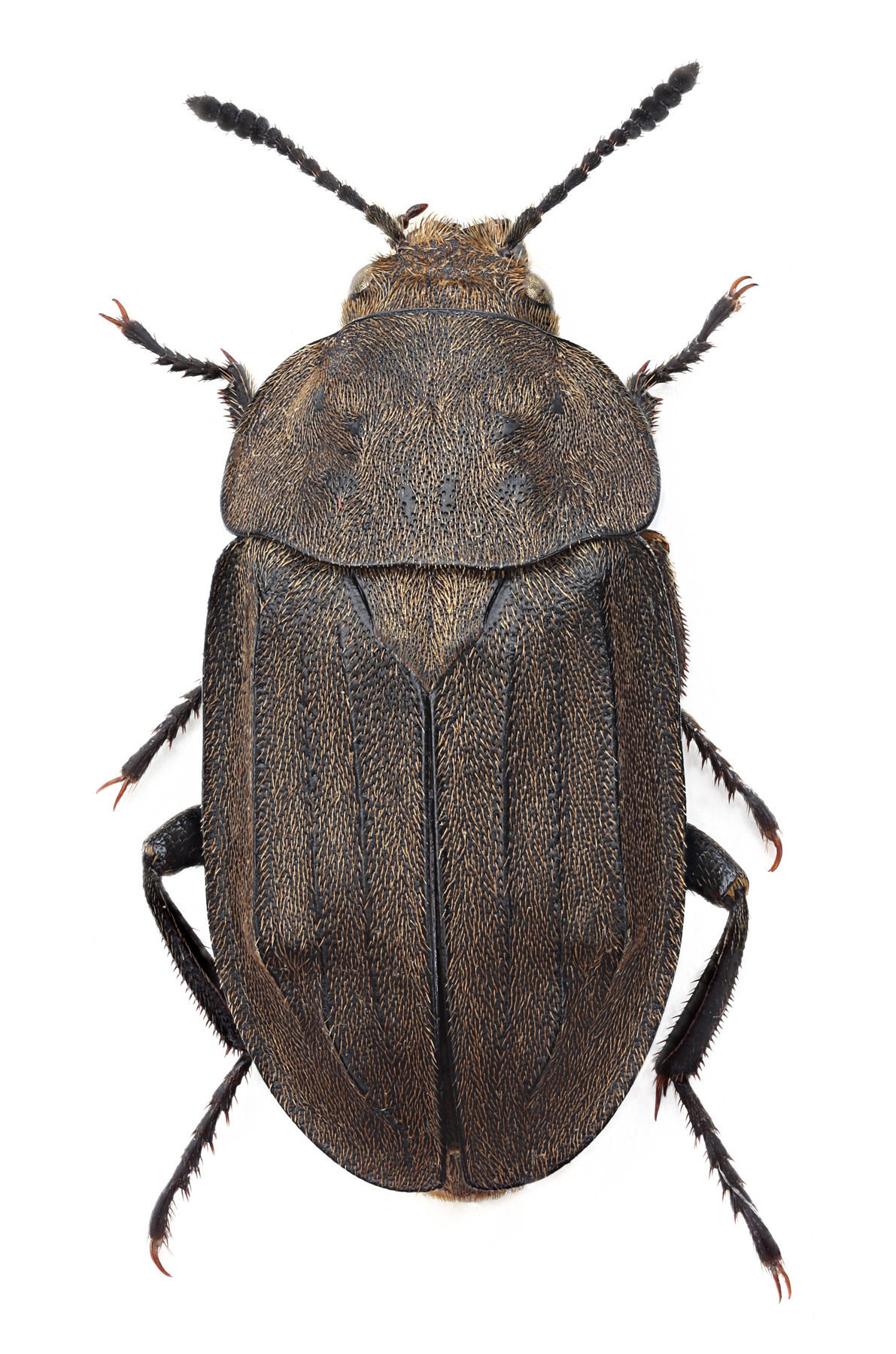

== Description ==
The beetles reach a body length of 9 to 12 millimeters. They have a black body colour, but are densely covered with fine golden hairs, rarely grey-haired, and occasionally there are also hairless individuals. The labrum (upper lip) is deeply notched at the front (a genus characteristic, different from the genus Silpha). The pronotum has, on each side of the middle, two (up to six) hairless, shiny spots, which may very rarely be missing. The elytra (wing covers) each have three longitudinal ridges, with a bump at the end of the third; between the ridges, they are flat and matt due to shallow, evenly spaced punctures. The tarsi are reddish-brown. In males, the first four segments of the front and middle legs are widened, and on these leg pairs there is also a sickle-shaped spine at the end of the tibiae.

== Biology ==
The adults live in fields and meadows and feed on a variety of plants, such as goosefoots, beets, and grasses. The females lay about 120 eggs in the soil over a period of around 45 days. The larvae that hatch from them are black with yellow edges. Their antennae are rusty red, and their legs are yellow-brown. They also feed on plants, mainly favoring amaranth family plants (Amaranthaceae). They either eat at the edges of the leaves or chew holes in them. Pupation happens in the soil. The new generation hatches in June and prepares in the autumn for wintering under stones or in dry leaves or forest litter. The main predators of the beetle include ground beetles, partridges, and pheasants.
