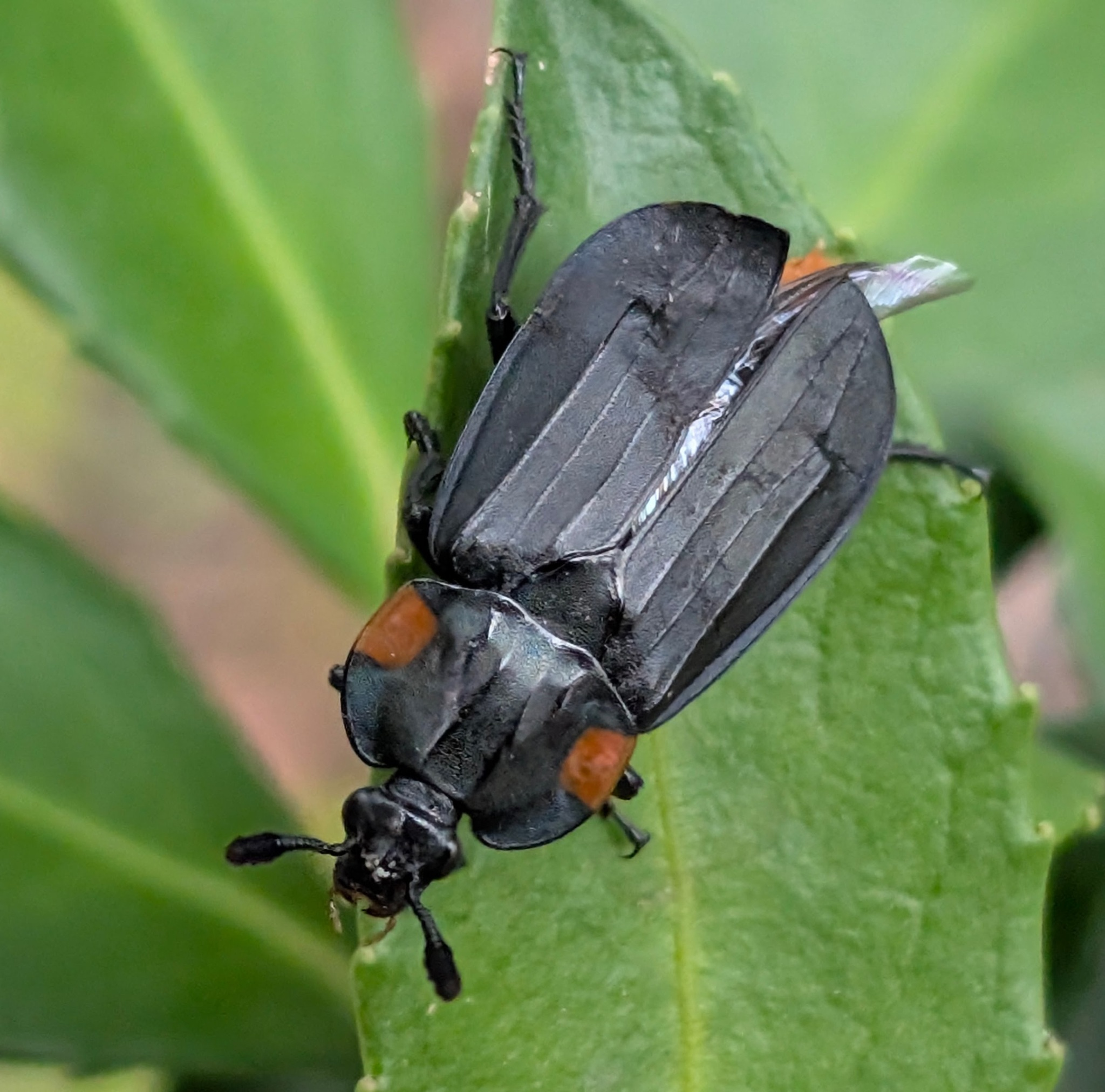
- Oxelytrum biguttatum in Southern Chile

Scientific classification
- Kingdom: Animalia
- Phylum: Arthropoda
- Clade: Pancrustacea
- Class: Insecta
- Order: Coleoptera
- Suborder: Polyphaga
- Infraorder: Staphyliniformia
- Family: Staphylinidae
- Subfamily: Silphinae
- Tribe: Silphini; Latreille, 1806

= Silphini =

Tribe of beetles

Silphini is a tribe of carrion beetles in the subfamily Silphinae. It contains the following genera:

- Ablattaria Reitter, 1884
- Aclypea Reitter, 1884
- Dendroxena Motschulsky, 1858
- Heterosilpha Portevin, 1926
- Heterotemna Wollaston, 1864
- Necrophila Kirby & Spence, 1828
- Oiceoptoma Leach, 1815
- Oxelytrum Gistel, 1848
- Phosphuga Leach, 1817
- Ptomaphila Kirby & Spence, 1828
- Silpha Linnaeus, 1758
- Thanatophilus Leach, 1815
- †Allopliosilpha Gersdorf, 1969
- †Pliosilpha Gersdorf, 1970
