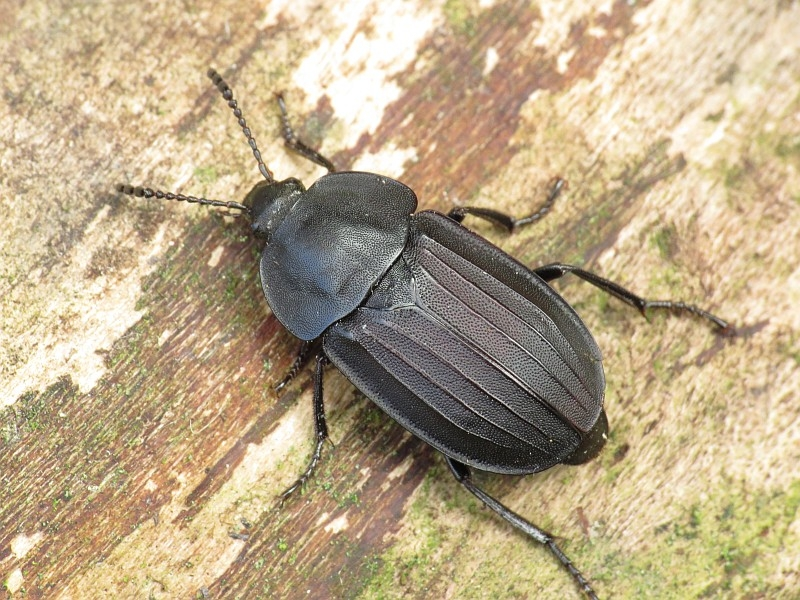
- Adult female
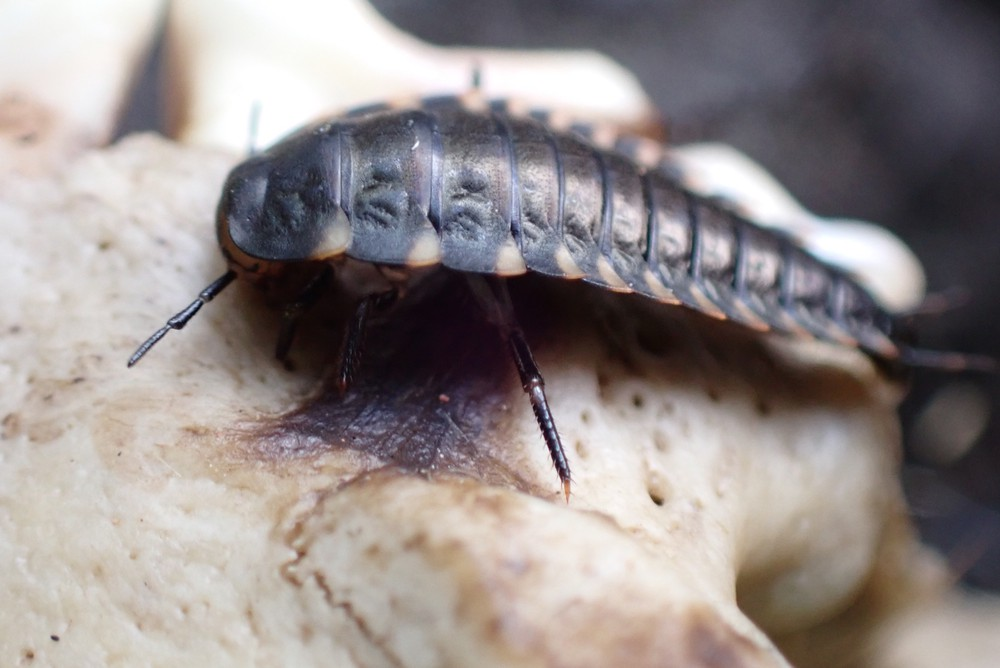
- Larvae

Scientific classification
- Kingdom: Animalia
- Phylum: Arthropoda
- Clade: Pancrustacea
- Class: Insecta
- Order: Coleoptera
- Suborder: Polyphaga
- Infraorder: Staphyliniformia
- Family: Staphylinidae
- Genus: Silpha
- Species: S. tristis

Binomial name
- Silpha tristis Illiger, 1798

= Silpha tristis =

Species of beetle

Silpha tristis is a species of carrion beetle in the family Silphidae. It is found in Europe and Northern Asia (excluding China) and North America. It was described in 1798 by the German entomologist Illiger.

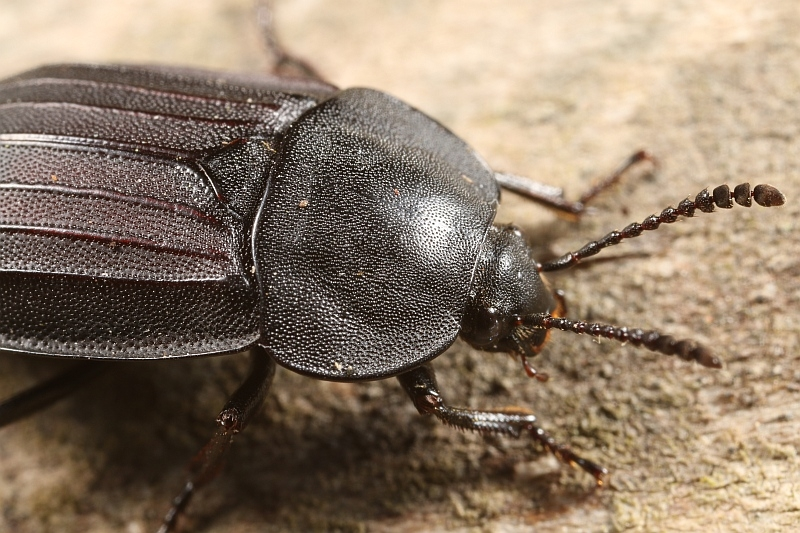

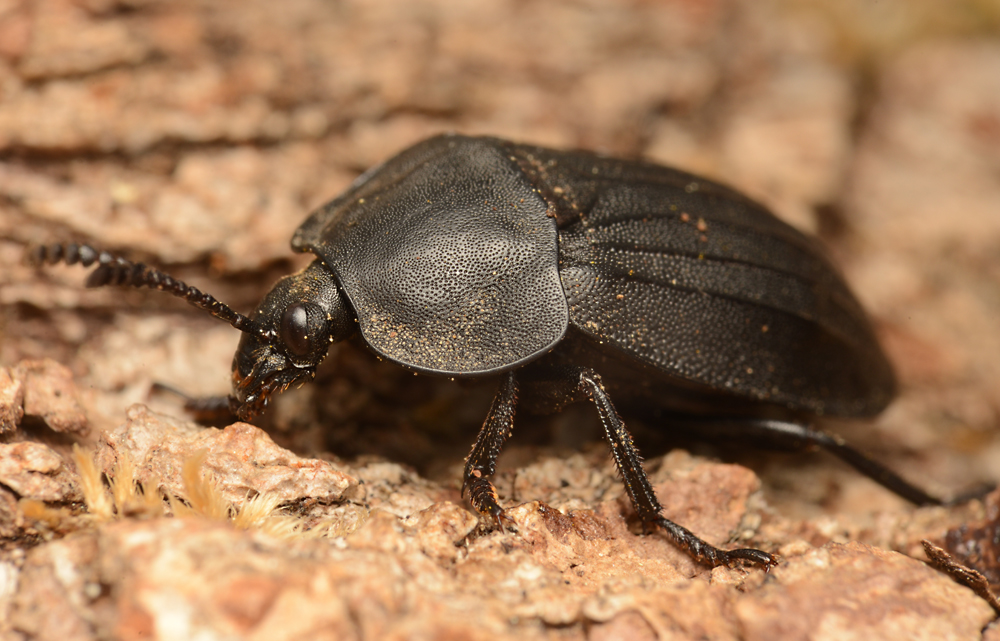
