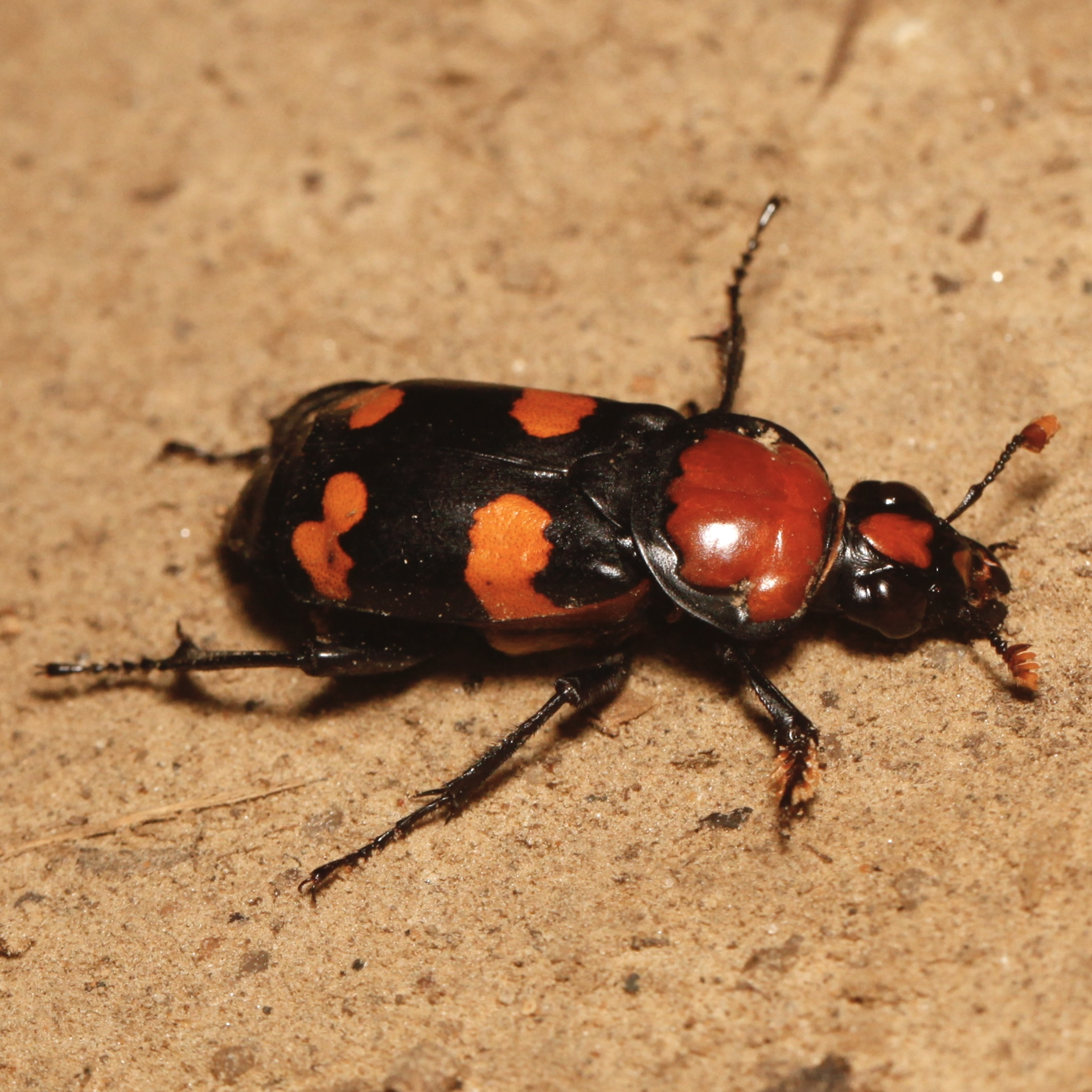
- adult female

Conservation status
- Critically Endangered (IUCN 3.1)

- Vulnerable (NatureServe)

Scientific classification
- Kingdom: Animalia
- Phylum: Arthropoda
- Clade: Pancrustacea
- Class: Insecta
- Order: Coleoptera
- Suborder: Polyphaga
- Infraorder: Staphyliniformia
- Family: Staphylinidae
- Genus: Nicrophorus
- Species: N. americanus

Binomial name
- Nicrophorus americanus (Olivier, 1790)
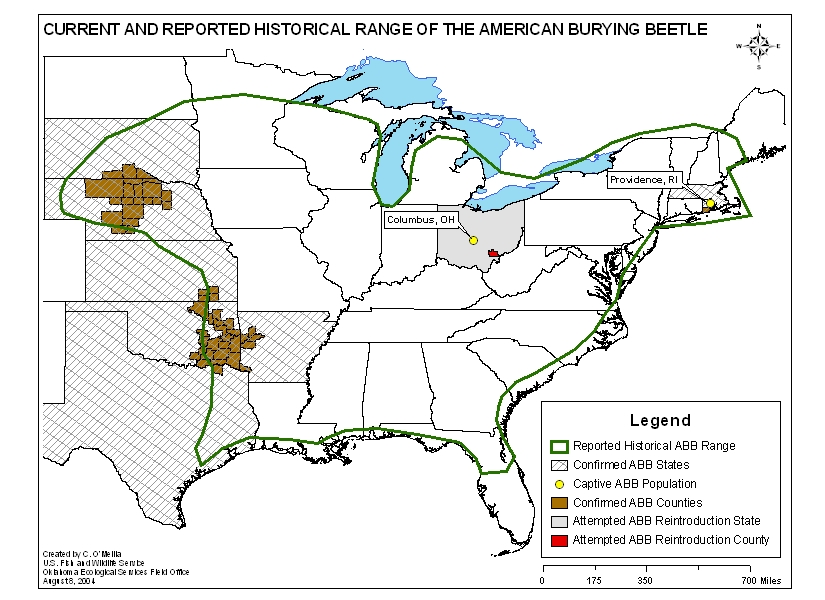

Synonyms
- Silpha (Nicrophorus) orientalis Herbst, 1784 (Unav.); Necrophorus [sic] grandis Fabricius, 1792; Nicrophorus virginicus Frölich, 1792

= Nicrophorus americanus =

Species of beetle

Nicrophorus americanus, also known as the American burying beetle or giant carrion beetle, is a critically endangered species of beetle endemic to North America. It belongs to the order Coleoptera and the family Silphidae. The carrion beetle in North America is carnivorous, feeds on carrion and requires carrion to breed. It is also a member of one of the few genera of beetle to exhibit parental care. The decline of the American burying beetle has been attributed to habitat loss, alteration, and degradation, and they now occur in less than 10% of their historic range.

== Description ==
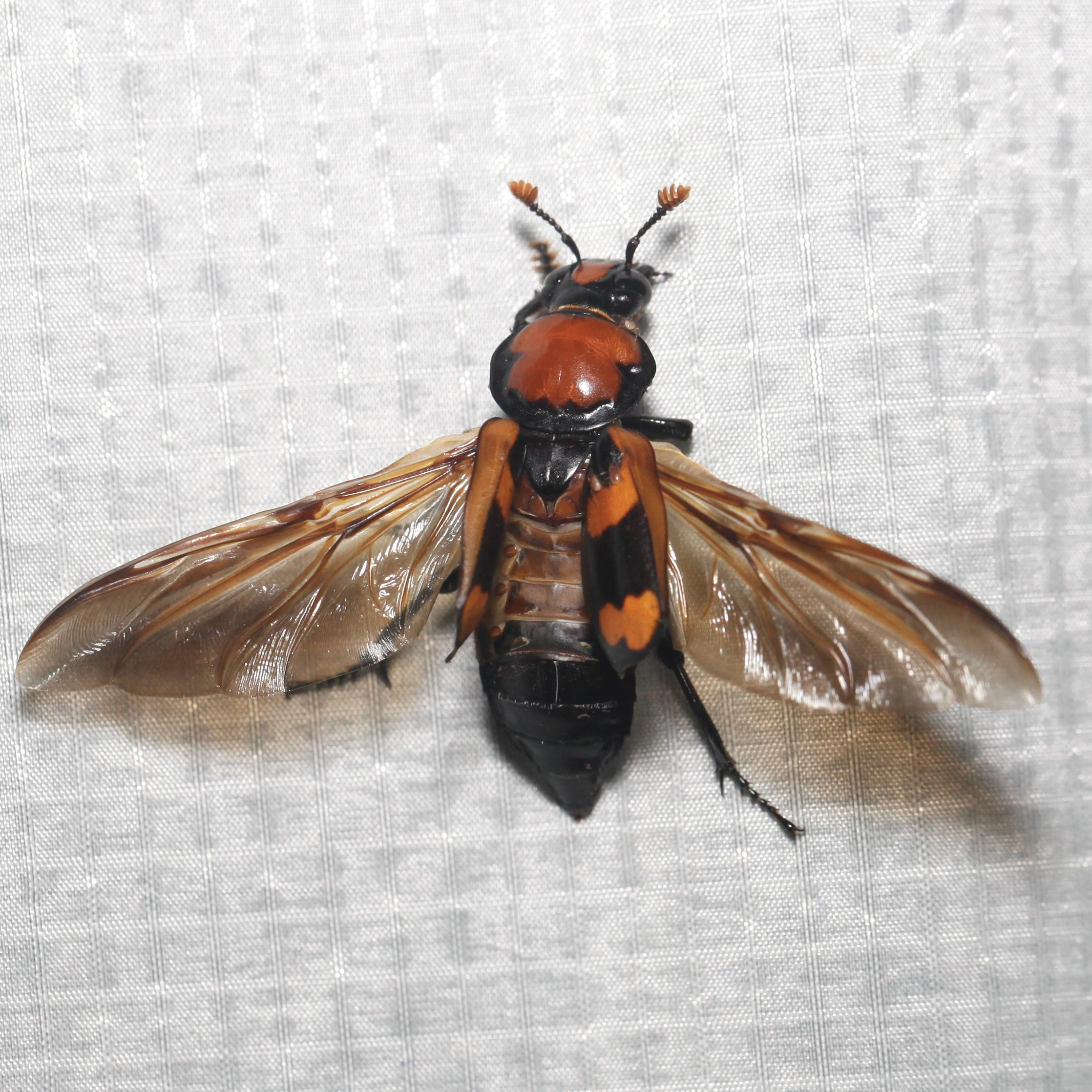
Adult female with wings spread before taking flight

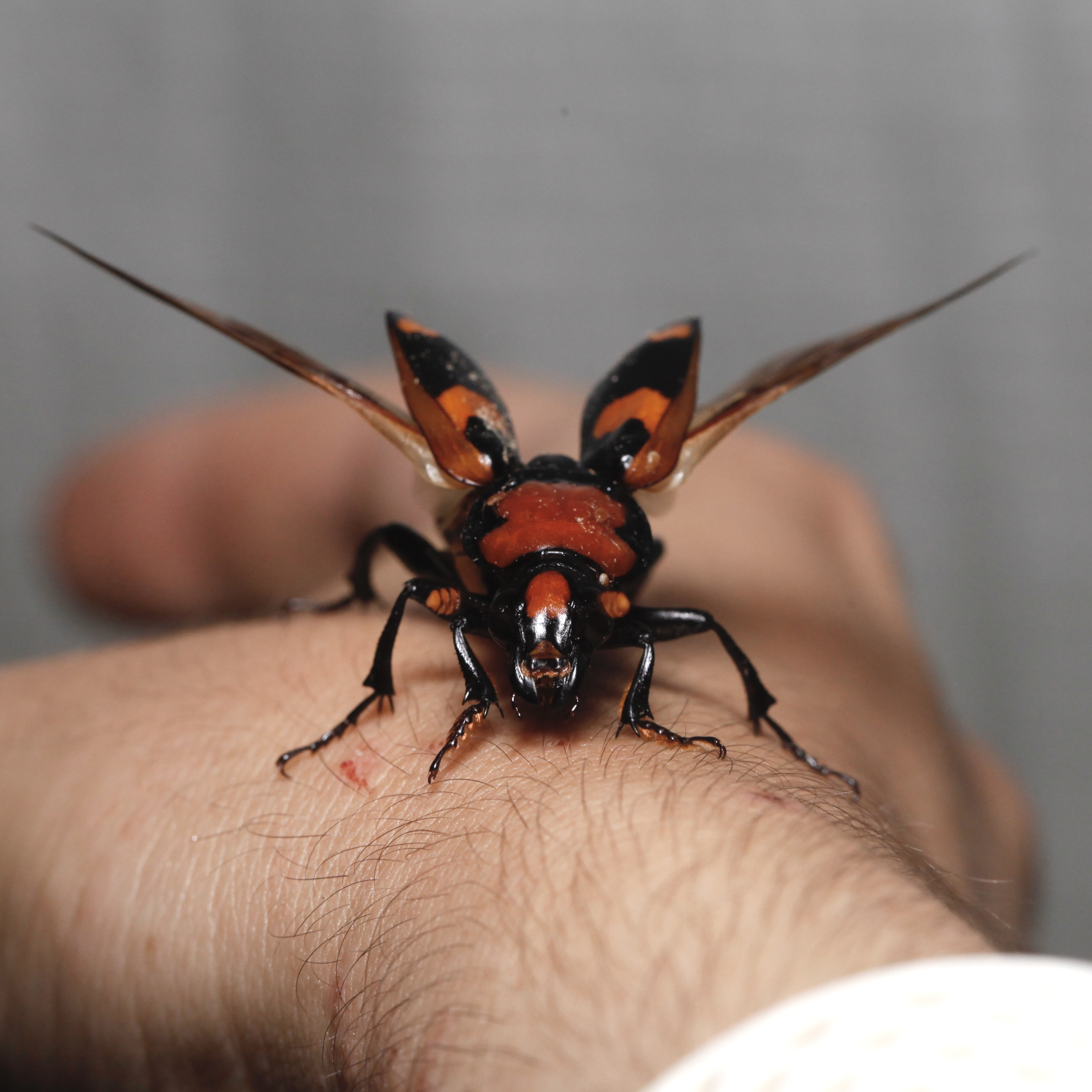
Adult female taking flight from human hand, showing large size

N. americanus adults are between 25 and 45 millimetres (0.98 and 1.77 in) long and can be identified by their striking, distinctive coloring. The body is shiny black, and on each elytron (wing cover) are two scalloped, orange-red markings. Most distinctively, there is an orange-red marking on the pronotum, which distinguishes the species from all other North American Nicrophorus. The front of the head has two orange markings, one on the frons and a smaller one on the clypeus, the sclerite just above the mouthparts. The orange mark on the clypeus is smaller and more triangular in females than in males. The labrum has dense orange setae on the distal edge, and the antennal club is mostly orange. The adult is nocturnal and a strong flier, moving as far as a kilometer in one night.

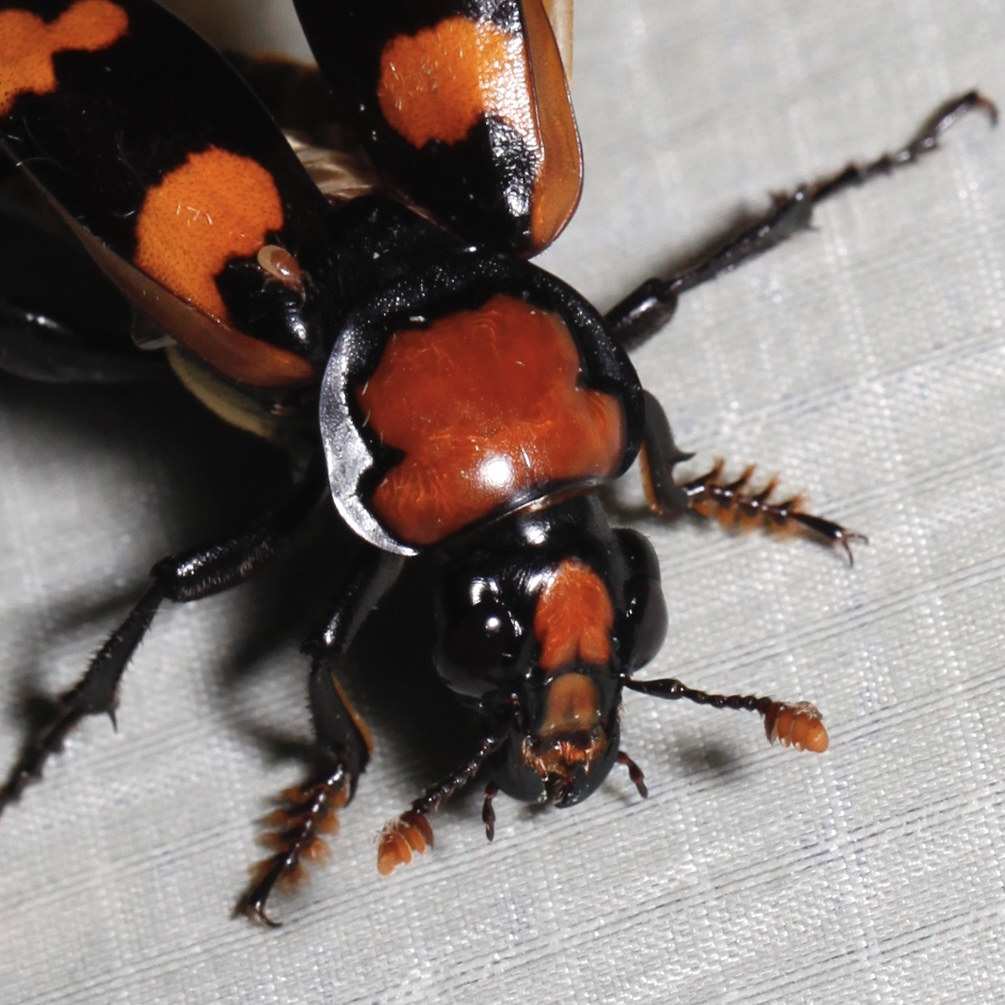
Orange marking on clypeus is large and rounded in males

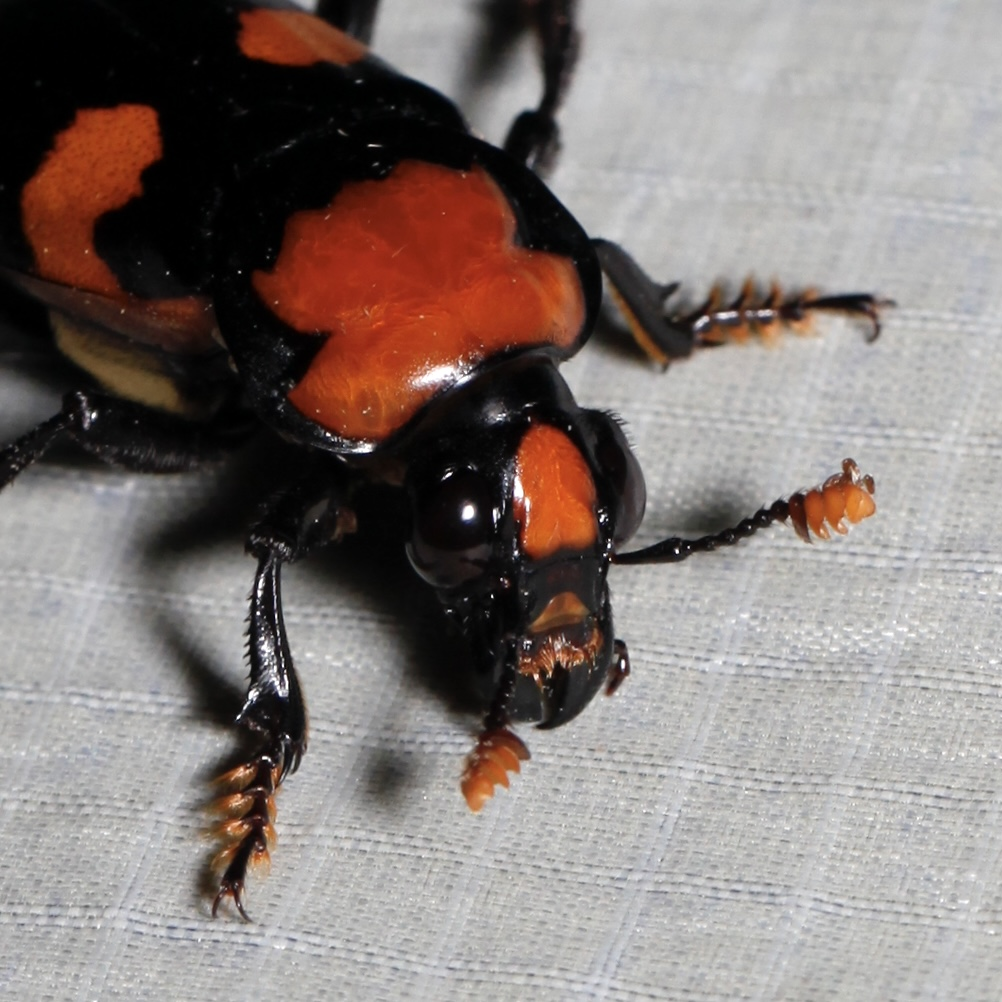
Orange marking on clypeus is small and triangular in females

== Distribution ==
Historical records show that this beetle once lived in 35 states and the District of Columbia in the United States, and the provinces of Ontario and Quebec in Canada. Currently, natural populations are known to occur in only ten states: Rhode Island (Block Island), Oklahoma, Arkansas, Texas, Kansas, South Dakota, and Nebraska; they have been reintroduced to Ohio, Massachusetts, and Missouri.

== Reproduction ==
During the winter months when temperatures are below 15 °C (60 °F) N. americanus adults bury themselves in the soil to overwinter. When temperatures are above 15 °C (60 °F) they emerge from the soil and begin the mating and reproduction process. Burying beetles are unusual in that both the male and female take part in raising the young. Male burying beetles often locate carcasses first and then attract a mate. Beetles often fight over the carcass, with usually the largest male and female individuals winning. The victors bury the carcass, the pair mates, and the female lays her eggs in an adjacent tunnel. Within a few days, the larvae develop and both parents feed and tend their young, an unusual activity among insects, but a characteristic shared with the earwig. Brood size usually ranges from one to 30 young, but 12 to 15 is the average size.

The larvae spend about a week feeding off the carcass then crawl into the soil to pupate, or develop. Mature N. americanus beetles emerge from the soil 45 to 60 days after their parents initially bury the carcass. Adult American burying beetles live for only 12 months.

== Ecology and behavior ==
Historical records offer little insight into what type of habitat was preferred by the American burying beetle. Current information suggests that this species is a habitat generalist, or one that lives in many types of habitat, with a slight preference for grasslands and open understory oak hickory forests. However, the beetles are carrion specialists in that they need carrion the size of a dove or a chipmunk in order to reproduce. Carrion availability may be the greatest factor determining where the species can survive.

== Conservation status ==
In Oklahoma, petitions were made in 2015 and 2016 to delist the species from endangered status as it came in the way of the oil and gas industry in the region. N. americanus was listed as an endangered species in 1989; the IUCN lists the species as critically endangered. Biologists have not determined conclusively why N. americanus has disappeared from so many areas. Widespread use of pesticides may have caused local populations to disappear. The dramatic disappearance of this insect from many areas, however, took place before widespread use of DDT. Lack of small carcasses to bury would prevent the species from reproducing, and changes in land use has reduced the quantity of small- to medium-sized birds and mammals preferred by N. americanus. Even the extinction of the once ubiquitous passenger pigeon may have had a ripple effect on carrion feeders like this beetle.

The immediate goal of conservation efforts is to reduce the threat of extinction by creating captive and wild populations. Biologists have attempted to establish a beetle population releasing laboratory-raised American burying beetles on Penikese Island and Nantucket island in Massachusetts. Biologists return each year to both islands to study the survival and growth of the beetle population.

In 2020, the species was reclassified as "threatened" by the U.S. Fish and Wildlife Service. The American burying beetle faces threats from climate change, particularly in the southwestern portion of its range, as well as from development causing habitat loss and fragmentation.
