= Pliosilpha =

Scientific classification
- Kingdom: Animalia
- Phylum: Arthropoda
- Clade: Pancrustacea
- Class: Insecta
- Order: Coleoptera
- Suborder: Polyphaga
- Infraorder: Staphyliniformia
- Family: Staphylinidae
- Tribe: Silphini
- Genus: Pliosilpha; Gersdorf, 1969
- Species: P. strausi

Binomial name
- Pliosilpha strausi Gersdorf, 1969

Extinct genus of beetles

Pliosilpha strausi is an extinct species of carrion beetle that lived in Germany during the Middle Pliocene. First described scientifically by Gersdorf in 1971, P. strausi is the only species in the genus Pliosilpha.
