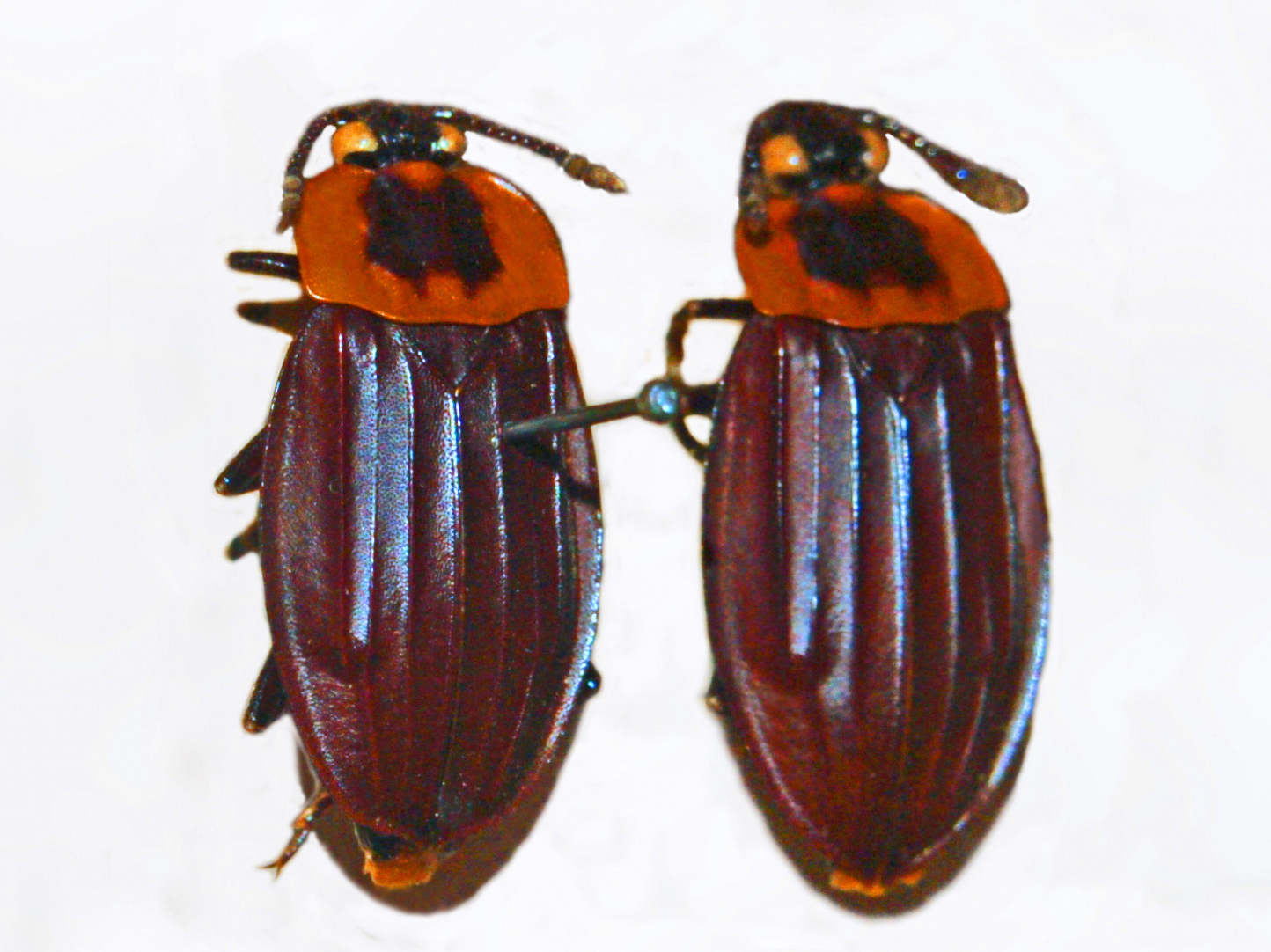
- Oxelytrum cayennense

Scientific classification
- Kingdom: Animalia
- Phylum: Arthropoda
- Clade: Pancrustacea
- Class: Insecta
- Order: Coleoptera
- Suborder: Polyphaga
- Infraorder: Staphyliniformia
- Family: Staphylinidae
- Subfamily: Silphinae
- Tribe: Silphini
- Genus: Oxelytrum; Gistel, 1848

Synonyms
- Hyponecrodes Kraatz, 1876; Katanecrodes Schouteden, 1905; Paranecrodes Portevin, 1921

= Oxelytrum =

Genus of beetles

Oxelytrum is a genus of carrion beetles belonging to the family Silphidae.

Species in this genus have three ridges on each elytron, without hairs on the pronotal disk. They are usually black with reddish markings and have 3-segmented antennal clubs. Most species are nocturnal and are mainly confined to South America.

== Species ==
- Oxelytrum anticola (Guerin-Meneville)
- Oxelytrum apicale (Brullé)
- Oxelytrum biguttatum (Philippi, 1850)
- Oxelytrum cayennense (Stürm, 1826)
- Oxelytrum discicolle (Brullé, 1836)
- Oxelytrum emarginatum (Portevin)
- Oxelytrum erythrurum (Blanchard, 1849)
- Oxelytrum lineatocolle (Laporte)
- Oxelytrum selknan Oliva, 2012
