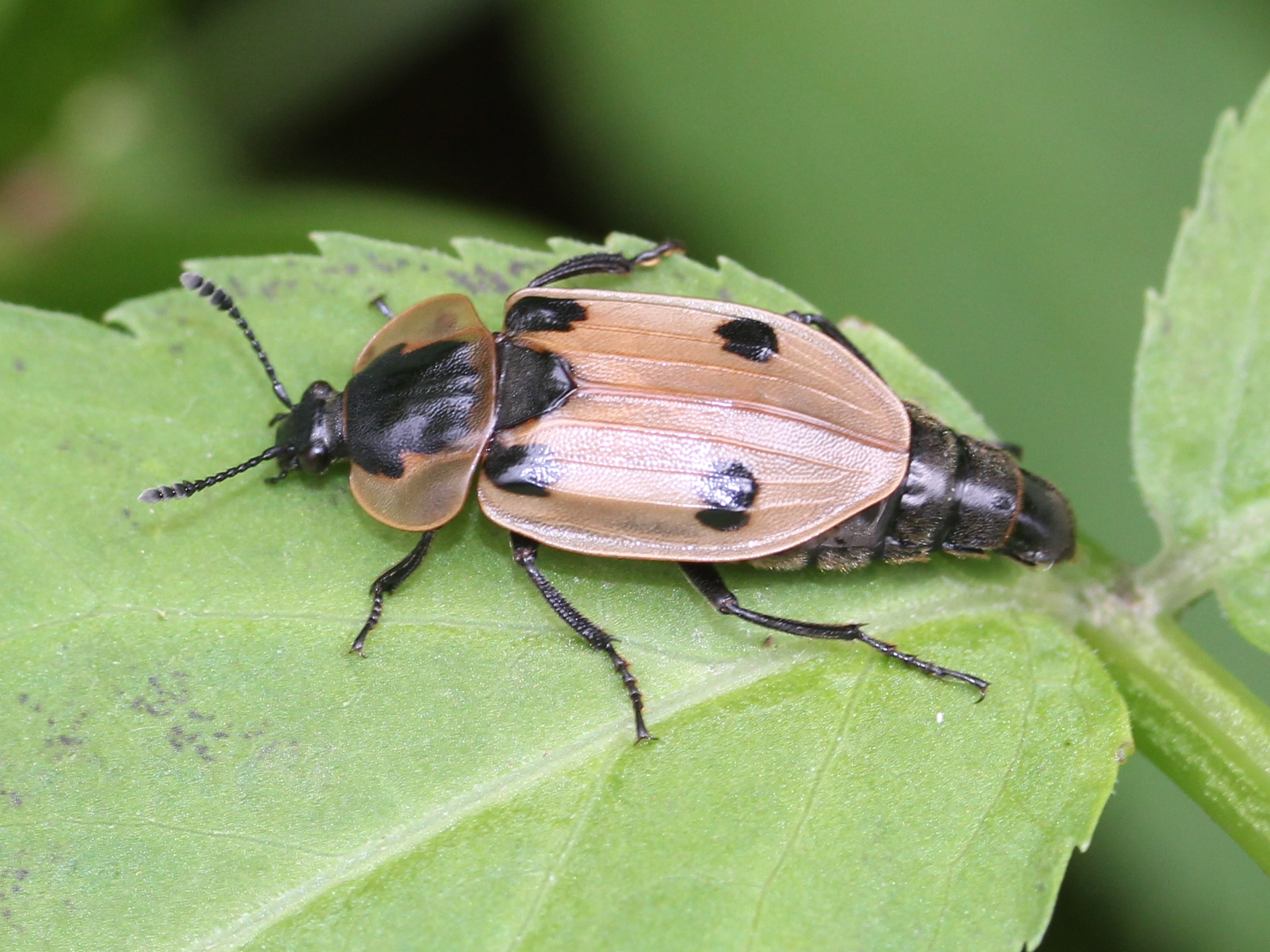
- Dendroxena sexcarinata

Scientific classification
- Kingdom: Animalia
- Phylum: Arthropoda
- Clade: Pancrustacea
- Class: Insecta
- Order: Coleoptera
- Suborder: Polyphaga
- Infraorder: Staphyliniformia
- Family: Staphylinidae
- Subfamily: Silphinae
- Tribe: Silphini
- Genus: Dendroxena; Motschulsky, 1858

Synonyms
- Xylodrepa Thomson, 1859

= Dendroxena =

Genus of beetles

Dendroxena is a genus of beetles in the family Silphidae.

The genus has a cosmopolitan distribution.

== Species ==
The following species are recognised in the genus Dendroxena:

- Dendroxena quadrimaculata (Scopoli, 1771)
- Dendroxena sexcarinata Motschulsky, 1861
