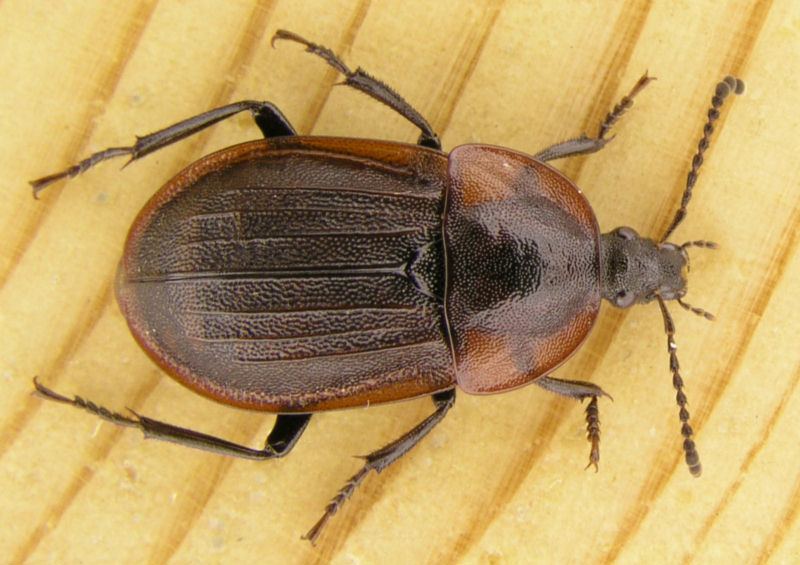
- Young adult

Scientific classification
- Kingdom: Animalia
- Phylum: Arthropoda
- Clade: Pancrustacea
- Class: Insecta
- Order: Coleoptera
- Suborder: Polyphaga
- Infraorder: Staphyliniformia
- Family: Staphylinidae
- Subfamily: Silphinae
- Tribe: Silphini
- Genus: Phosphuga; Leach, 1817
- Species: P. atrata

Binomial name
- Phosphuga atrata (Linnaeus, 1758)

Synonyms
- See main text

= Phosphuga =

Genus of beetles

Phosphuga is a Eurasian genus of flightless carrion beetle, whose sole member is the species Phosphuga atrata, commonly known as black snail beetle. Up to 15mm long, they have an oval shape as adults and are brownish in color when newly moulted, becoming black as their exoskeleton hardens. Black snail beetles resemble (and are presumably closely related to and sometimes even included in) the type genus Silpha of the carrion beetle subfamily Silphinae, and are thus placed in tribe Silphini. Although they range widely, they are seldom encountered by people, because they hunt at night and hide during the day, often under bark.

== Ecology ==
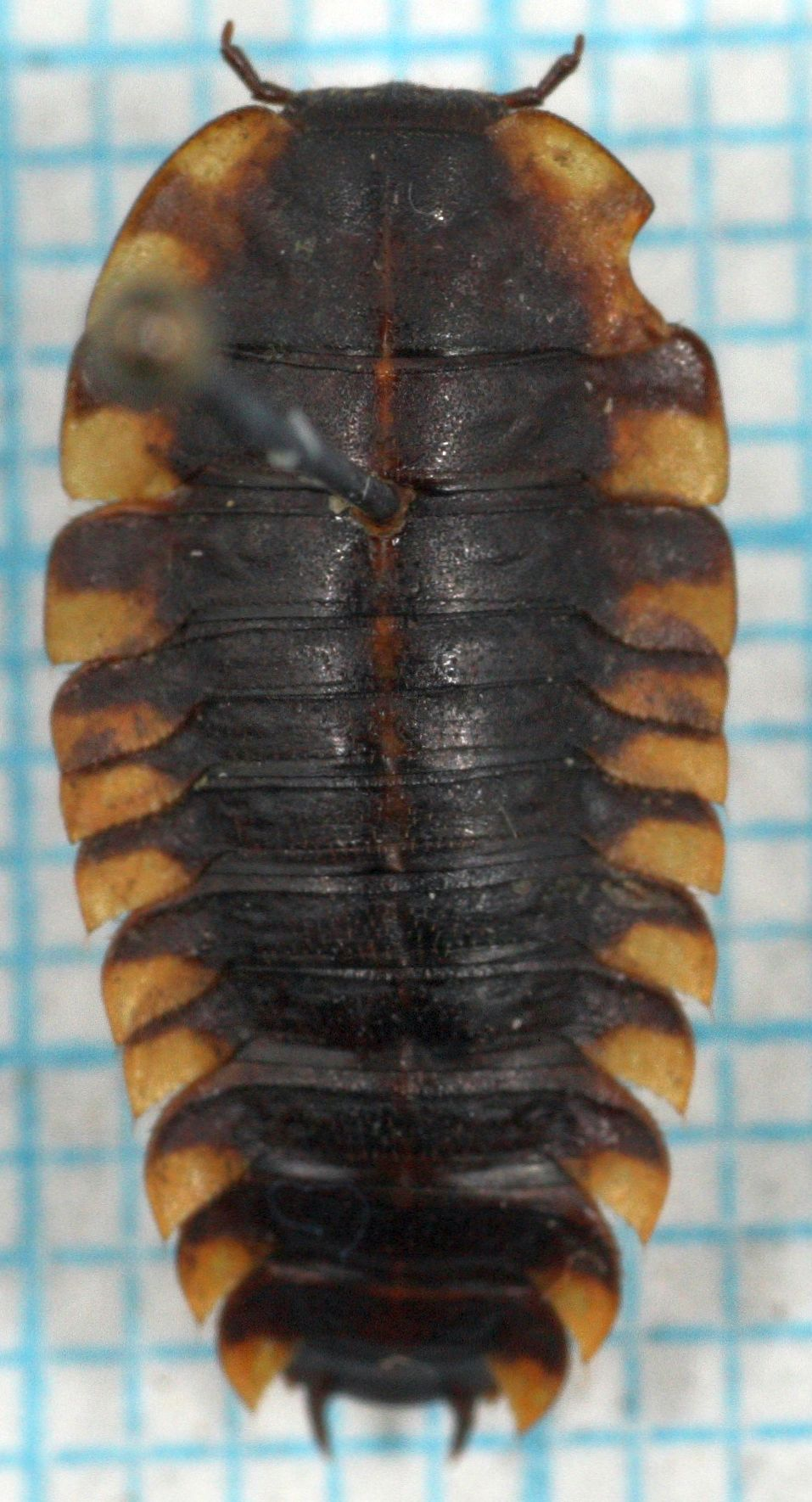
Larva

Adults are flightless, lacking flight muscles, and feed on live snails, insects and earthworms, as well as on carrion. This beetle has an elongated neck that it uses to reach into snail shells, which it sprays with a digestive fluid. When disturbed, they excrete a yellow fluid and retract their head under the shield. The larvae are flattened, black with brown edges to their armor plates, and feed on snails as well. They pupate in the ground.

Range: Europe (including UK), Russia (European, Siberia, Far East, Kuriles), Turkey, Armenia, Azerbaijan, Georgia, Iran, Afghanistan, Kyrgyzstan, Kazakhstan, Tajikistan, Turkmenistan, Uzbekistan, Mongolia, Korea (N, S), Japan, India (Kashmir), China (Heilongjiang+); intro Iceland

== Synonyms ==
Initially described and sometimes still placed in genus Silpha, the black snail beetle was occasionally even allied with the unrelated polyphagan genus Peltis of the vegetarian cleroid superfamily. Throughout the centuries, specimens from across its vast range have been described numerous times as supposedly distinct species, and at least two subtaxa have been named; none of these are considered distinct today:

- Peltis (Phosphuga) atrata var. rostrata Reitter, 1888
- Peltis subparalella Reitter, 1884
- Phosphuga atrata subrotundata Leach, 1817
- Phosphuga cassidea Kraatz, 1876
- Silpha atrata Linnaeus, 1758
- Silpha fusca Herbst, 1793
- Silpha nitida Faldermann, 1835
- Silpha paedemontana Fabricius, 1775
- Silpha punctata De Geer, 1774
- Silpha shakotana Kôno, 1929
