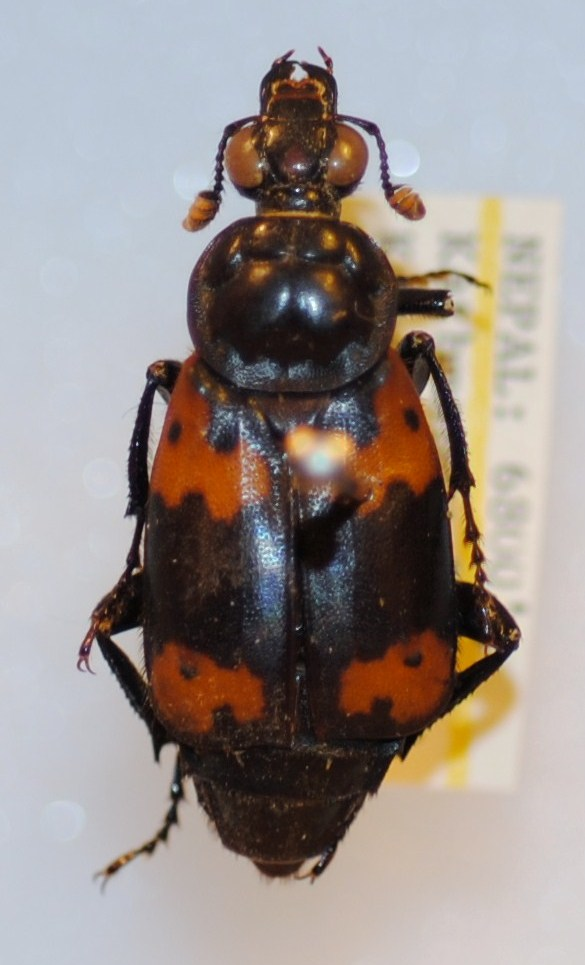
- Female of Nicrophorus nepalensis

Scientific classification
- Kingdom: Animalia
- Phylum: Arthropoda
- Clade: Pancrustacea
- Class: Insecta
- Order: Coleoptera
- Suborder: Polyphaga
- Infraorder: Staphyliniformia
- Family: Staphylinidae
- Genus: Nicrophorus
- Species: N. nepalensis

Binomial name
- Nicrophorus nepalensis Hope, 1831

Synonyms
- Necrophorus [sic] Nepalensis Hope, 1831; Necrophorus [sic] ocellatus Deyrolle & Fairmaire, 1878; Necrophorus [sic] benguetensis Arnett, 1946

= Nicrophorus nepalensis =

Species of beetle

Nicrophorus nepalensis, commonly known as burying beetle, is widespread across tropical and subtropical countries in Asia. It belongs to the order Coleoptera and the family Silphidae, and is part of the nepalensis species-group, which is the second largest species group within the genus Nicrophorus. N. nepalensis differs from some other beetles in that it exhibits biparental care. Its role as a decomposer is crucial in the energy cycle and energy transformation in the ecosystem.

== Description ==
The body of N. nepalensis is shiny black and has unique elytral patterns with four separated scalloped, orange markings and black dots in both anterior and posterior fascia. The basal segment of the antennae is black and the tips are club shaped with three orange segments. Frons of the female have an elliptical shape, whereas those of the male are more rectangular. A distinct feature that separates males from females is the conspicuous orange spot on the clypeus near the mandible. Another feature is the post-ocular bulge found in males. Pronotal width is a common measurement of beetle size, and adult N. nepalensis can range from 3.6 to 7.0 mm, with no significant variations between male and female.

== Distribution ==
N. nepalensis can be found primarily in the mountainous regions in eastern Asia and the Malay Archipelago, with a distribution ranging from 73°E (Pakistan) to 149°E (Papua New Guinea) longitudinally and from 51°N (Ussuri, Russia) to 9°48′S (Papua New Guinea) latitudinally. Countries within this range includes Pakistan, India, China, Laos, Burma, Thailand, Vietnam, Taiwan, Japan, Philippines, and Malaysia.

== Habitat ==
N. nepalensis can migrate along elevational gradients depending on their thermal optimum and the surrounding temperature. In most tropical areas, they are found at high elevations in cool temperatures. Yet, they can also be found in lower elevations likely due to their tolerance to warmer weather. Under certain circumstances such as limited resources and competition from other insects or vertebrates, N. nepalensis would cooperate with individuals of the same species to optimize their chances of reproduction and survival. Group size differs with elevation and air temperature. Cooperative groups, which are thermal generalists can perform high breeding success at all temperatures and elevations, whereas non-cooperative groups can only breed well at intermediate temperatures and elevations, making them thermal specialists.

=== Environmental variability ===
N. nepalensis demonstrates an exceptional capacity to move over elevational gradients in response to fluctuations in environmental variables. While traditionally associated with mountainous regions in eastern Asia, including areas with elevations exceeding 4000 meters above sea level, recent findings suggest a broader habitat range. The species has shown a capacity to adapt to varying thermal optima, allowing it to thrive in diverse ecosystems ranging from montane forests to lowland grasslands. Additionally, the research underscores the significance of microhabitat features such as soil moisture and vegetation structure in shaping the distribution of N. nepalensis populations. This ecological flexibility is crucial for the species' survival in dynamic environments and underscores its role as a key player in nutrient cycling and decomposition processes across different landscapes.

== Resources and environmental conditions ==
N. nepalensis can live up to four months, with its lifespan heavily dependent upon the availability of food resources and surrounding environmental conditions. Changing seasons and day lengths that directly influence abiotic factors such as temperature and photoperiod influence the time needed for N. nepalensis to reach sexual maturity. The interaction between such factors can trigger diapause, causing insect dormancy. Research done by Hwang and Shiao (2011) indicates that long day lengths with high temperature during summer inhibit ovarian growth where ovaries were not supplied with adequate nutrition. In addition, the interaction between temperature and humidity plays a major role in influencing microbial activity. High temperatures and high humidity accelerate carcass decomposition and allow maggots to grow faster.

There are many consequences associated with inferior quality and quantity of the carcass meat. When the food source is limited and the female still lays a large number of eggs, this leads to higher female mortality. An insufficient quantity of available carcass meat will result in reduced female fitness since there is not enough food to feed all the larvae. Additionally, an excess of larvae in one brood under constrained food source could hinder their pupation, resulting in offspring with reduced size or a lower success rate for future reproduction.

More studies have demonstrated that these environmental factors are crucial in influencing the behavior and physiology of the species. For instance, changing seasons and day lengths directly affect abiotic factors like temperature and photoperiod, which in turn influence the time needed for N. nepalensis to reach sexual maturity. It have indicated that long day lengths coupled with high temperatures during summer can inhibit ovarian growth in females when ovaries are not adequately supplied with nutrition. Moreover, the interaction between temperature and humidity has been found to significantly impact microbial activity, particularly in carcass decomposition processes. High temperatures combined with high humidity levels accelerate carcass decomposition and facilitate faster growth of maggots, influencing the availability of food resources for N. nepalensis. Comprehending the complex connections between environmental variables and the life cycle of a species is crucial for thoroughly evaluating its ecological dynamics and conservation requirements.

== Parental care ==
N. nepalensis tend to exhibit less parental care as their offspring get older. In comparison with other carrion beetles, N. nepalensis have less control in the number of offspring they produce. Recent studies have shown that competition with harmful microbes influence parental care behaviors in these beetles; high microbial competition leads to lower parental care and low microbial competition allows for higher parental care.

== Social behavior ==
Intraspecies dynamics within populations of N. nepalensis has been forgone in most research settings and instead interspecific competition such as the competitive exclusion by small Indian mongoose populations has been more heavily investigated. Interspecies competition can be used as an influencing force on the transformation of intraspecies conflict to intraspecies competition in N. nepalensis. Only one chemical cue, the emittance of dimethyl disulfide or more commonly known as DMDS, can cause N. nepalensis to take on a more cooperative stance in terms of burying carcasses. This form of social cooperation becomes seemingly activated when populations of blowfly maggots start to digest the tissue of these carcasses claimed by N. nepalensis. This is because dimethyl disulfide is emitted from carcasses consumed by the blowfly maggots but is not emitted from control carcasses which had no interactions with blowflies.

This social behavior has been quite difficult to empirically quantify since social animals like N. nepalensis engage commonly in shared investment over resources that benefit the entire group. In the experiment, researchers collected N. nepalensis from Nantou County, Taiwan, and utilized chromatography-mass spectrometry to quantify the dimethyl sulfide emitted from the blowflies. While the actual chemical reasoning behind the social chemical cue that triggers cooperation is unknown, researchers have proven that the dimethyl sulfide treatment changes social behavior while hexane controls do not.

It is still unclear as to how intraspecies conflict creates a mechanistic change in N. nepalensis conditional cooperative strategies. The chemical mechanism is not explained by the paper, which could be a helpful component in future research aiming to investigate how simple chemical indicators can modulate behavior in N. nepalensis.

== Behavior and reproduction ==
N. nepalensis is carnivorous and feeds on carcasses of small vertebrates such as rodents and birds. Carcasses are crucial resources for reproduction, as beetles would deposit eggs around a buried carcass where their larval broods can feed on. Fresh carcasses are rare in the wild due to intense competition from the same or different species of burying beetle, blow flies, invertebrates and other mammals. N. nepalensis is one of the few species of beetle that exhibits extensive biparental care, which includes defending the larvae against competitors and regurgitating predigested carcass to their young.

The larvae of N. nepalensis go through three instars, which are developmental stages of arthropods. After feeding off the carcass for about two weeks, the third instar larvae leave the crypt and prepare to pupate and eventually metamorphose into adults.

== Migration ==
Based on the premonition that beetle species tend to migrate to regions at a higher latitude with very similar climates to their native climate when global warming occurs, researchers looked at migration patterns of N. nepalensis between different microhabitats. This is known as the regional climate model. Researchers investigated forest and meadow ecosystems and found that N. nepalensis exhibits great temperature sensitivity. As a result, they are known to exhibit both hibernation behaviors and estivation behaviors. While their life history didn't significantly change, N. nepalensis showed different habitat preferences for different temperatures. Their existence and activity decreased when the ambient temperature exceeded 26˚C. Their peak activity was shown to be in autumn, but it shifted year over year. This showed that the migration of stenothermal species like N. nepalensis alters their diversity within ecosystems.

In addition to seasonal migration, N. nepalensis also exhibits altitudinal migration. Researchers found that N. nepalensis migrate to higher elevations during warmer months and migrate to lower elevations during colder months. The distributions of N. nepalensis are shown to be shifting in both latitude and elevation as a result of climate change.

=== Climate ===
There are certainly several intrinsic species factors such as small mammal decomposition in carcasses being influenced by the ambient temperatures. According to researchers, it is expected that warmer climates accelerate carcass decomposition, but carcass size, water and sunlight availability, and microbial activity all determine carcass condition. As a result, thermally sensitive N. nepalensis populations vary in meadow and forest habitats due to migration patterns. They shift based on climate warming to preserve nutrient cycling, but long-term trends cannot be established without further longitudinal experimentation.

== Enemies ==
Researchers have recently found a form of competitive exclusion against N. nepalensis by way of the small Indian mongoose. The competitive exclusion has led to local extinction,N. nepalensis in Okinawa. Competitive exclusion is a biological process through which one species can rapidly drive another species towards extinction by outcompeting them for food and habitat space. Unlike other biological forms of competition like parasitism, competition occurs over third-party resources and there exists very little direct interaction between the competing species.

In this experiment, researchers hypothesized that the observed extinction of N. nepalensis in Okinawa was due to competition over carcasses of small vertebrates in the area with the small Indian mongoose. They tested their hypothesis by comparing the abundance of N. nepalensis in areas with strong and then weak/nonexistent mongoose control. They purposely scattered mouse carcasses in the vicinity of both areas to ensure equal carcass competition as well. Results showed that beetle abundance was greatest in areas with tighter mongoose control. They found no N. nepalensis were collected in areas with no mongoose control. In areas with no mongoose control, beetles were able to bury mouse carcasses while in areas with more stringent mongoose control, beetles were unable to bury mouse carcasses since mongooses consumed them too frequently.

These results show clear evidence of competitive exclusion exercised by small Indian mongoose populations on populations of N. nepalensis. More interestingly, this was the first reported conclusive finding of competitive exclusion across phyla in any ecosystem. However, researchers did mention that the competitive exclusion, in part, likely occurred due to predation over small vertebrates and not just due to the consumption of mouse carcasses.

Recent investigations have provided insight into the complex dynamics of competitive exclusion found in populations of N. nepalensis, specifically in relation to interactions with the tiny Indian mongoose. Competitive exclusion, a process known to precipitate local extinction, was analyzed in relation to resource competition, specifically over carcasses of small vertebrates in areas cohabited by N. nepalensis and small Indian mongooses. Through controlled experiments comparing areas with varying levels of mongoose presence, researchers found compelling evidence of competitive exclusion, as evidenced by the absence of N. nepalensis in locations with stronger mongoose control. Observed competitive exclusion may be caused by a mix of resource competition and direct predation. These findings underscore the complexity of interspecies interactions and their profound implications for population dynamics and ecosystem stability.

== Genetics ==
Larval morphology was analyzed to determine the genetic relatedness between three different instars of Nicrophorus. Using reared larvae, researchers found that the Palearctic and Oriental nepalensis share many characteristics with the western Paleaarchtic nepalensis. As Sikes previously found, there is a probable phylogenetic affinity of the N. nepalensis group with the N. humator group.

Researchers have also analyzed the complete mitochondrial genome of N. nepalensis. It consists of 17,299 base pairs, includes 13 genes that encode for proteins (exon sequences that were not spliced out during post-transcriptional modifications), with a mitogenomen distribution of 39.5% A, 37.2% T, 13.5% C, and 9.7% G. The extensive genome also consists of 22 tRNA genes (transfer RNA), 2 rRNA genes (ribosomal RNA), and a 2693 base pair adenine-thymine control region.

Researchers performed the genome sequencing on an Illumina HiSeq2500 platform and built a full ML phylogenetic tree. They divided the tree into eight separate partitions and used bootstrap values to assign accuracy (accounting for variance and prediction error). To offer a broad overview, researchers only look at adult N. nepalensis, which on average, were about 20 mm in length. They were typically black, had a brow with a red-orange spot, and had a clypeal membrane.

=== Phylogeny ===
To better understand the assembled mitogenome of N. nepalensis, researchers hope to shed light on the evolutionary history of its phylogenetic relationships with other species within the genus (like the humator species and oriental species). Furthermore, in better understanding its genomic underpinnings, researchers will be able to investigate certain unique reproductive behaviors in the realm of parental care that share close similarities with human physiology (i.e. providing carrion for larvae and cooperation between males and females in caring for newborns).

== Mating ==
Mating systems among N. nepalensis center quite extensively around competition for reproductive resources. Their body sizes determine who wins these competitions for breeding resources. There is a relationship between secondary sexual characteristics degeneration and body size in males. They then compared the strategies used by different forms of male beetles based on their vocal structure and associated behavior. They used simulated data of wild-caught males and laboratory-bred males under a series of parental crosses. Ultimately, they found no influence of the genetic makeup of congenital parents on female body size (no significant difference was found in the sexual characteristic ratio among female groups).

Researchers also looked at the impact of food intake on body size, the effects of gender and sexual characteristics on vocal organs, and the effect of gender and sexual characteristics on vocal behaviors. Ultimately, they found that males engage in intimidating behaviors as the size of competing males gets smaller. They found the converse to be true as well, that males possess less intimidating behavior when competitors have larger bodies. Researchers also found a certain form of development plasticity in N. nepalensis in response to being at a competitive disadvantage during mating processes.

These are usually the result of food shortages or dysplasia. Males who cannot obtain enough food develop competitive morphs during their larval stage and change their reproductive strategy to make their sexual characteristics more closely resemble females. In this way, dominant males treat the inferior ones like females. Finally, intrasexual competition between N. nepalensis does not involve fighting and is usually low-frequency intimidating (inferior males show their inferiority by being more silent, and more dominant males make low-pitch sounds as an intimidation tactic).

== Physiology ==
An important aspect of the physiology of N. nepalensis includes their tarsal morphology and the extent to which they can maintain traction force. In a comparative analysis, researchers looked into the friction and traction forces generated by N. nepalensis and Nicrophorus vespilloides. Each possesses different abilities when it comes to attachment and climbing, and thus researchers sought to investigate bioadhesion similarities and differences.

Firstly, from a purely physiological perspective, N. nepalensis has widened shovel-like tibiae at the end of all pairs of legs. Each foot also has two flexible, hinge-like claws with bristle-like hairs. Researchers found that due to similar physiologies, both N. nepalensis and N. vespilloides had similar traction force on rough surfaces.

=== Sexual dimorphisms ===
In terms of sex differences, it was found that N. nepalensis have differences on their front-side tarsi between males and females. While males have a spatula-shaped hair pattern, females have a lanceolate-type hair pattern. Despite different types of adhesive setae between the sexes, however, there were no intraspecies sex differences in traction force.

Furthermore, researchers found that adhesive setae were generally longer towards the distal end of the tarsal structure which holds across several species of burying beetles. In addition to adhesive setae and tarsal length, researchers analyzed claws as an important metric for generating traction force for burying capabilities. They found that claw removal reduced traction force and that N. nepalensis showed a reduction in attachment force on smooth surfaces (as well as partially rough surfaces) after claw removal. This intrinsically shows that claws are fundamentally important for generating great force, providing N. nepalensis with locomotion in soil, and for general ground digging. The study focuses on intact vs. clipped claws, so the extent to which claw length can affect digging behavior has yet to be proven by experimentation.

== Social rank and hierarchy ==
N. nepalensis populations establish intraspecies social ranks and hierarchies. These power structures based on intraspecies dominance hold value concerning investment into cooperative behaviors (such as foraging and parental care) as well as competitive behaviors seen during mating and reproductive processes. Despite the established hierarchy, social conflict among these beetles decrease in turbulent environments because the interests of the group become more aligned. Inferior N. nepalensis demonstrate high levels of cooperativity due to interspecies competition and/or extremely insufficient abiotic factors.

== Interspecies cooperation ==
Researchers interested in climate-mediated social interactions between species have tested their prediction that interspecies competition creates a narrow range for temperature preference on N. nepalensis. They used the more natural competitor to N. nepalensis, blowflies, to analyze how recovering a certain breeding temperature (optimal to secure mating patterns, enhance child rearing, and optimize postnatal parental care) explains N. nepalensis outcompeting the blowflies. Researchers noted how N. nepalensis lay eggs around the carcasses of small animals (like mice) to provide their offspring with food. Nicrophorus nepalensis cooperate to defend offspring from blowflies, who also tend to lay their eggs on the carcasses of small animals.

It was found that the presence of blowflies created a larger temperature range in which N. nepalensis could optimally survive and reproduce. A form of indirect intraspecies competition, however, was also observed as antagonistic effects of cooperation were found. According to researchers, N. nepalensis relies on vertebrate carcasses for reproductive success, which leads to intense interspecies competition over limited resources.

While interspecific cooperation can reduce the realized niche regarding temperature preference, intraspecies cooperation can also affect the optimal temperature performance of N. nepalensis. Researchers formed thermal preference curves (TPCs) in which they looked at how biotic factors like intraspecies cooperation could allow a thermal preference species like N. nepalensis to naturally adapt to lower temperatures. Thus, research has shown that intraspecies competition can have antagonistic effects on temperature.

This is different from innate physiological preferences, as this temperature change reflects a behavioral adaptation to collective group efforts. Research on the antagonistic effects of interspecies competition has remained prevalent in recent years, but these new findings on intraspecies competition having antagonistic effects on thermal preference present troubling news in light of the imposing effects of climate change.

== Conservation ==
Using N. nepalensis as a model system, researchers have been able to better monitor the long-term biodiversity of different ecosystems. Most markedly, researchers have analyzed the biodiversity of the Hapen Nature Preserve in northern Taiwan, where they have been investigating fluctuations in species compositions of various beetle populations for six years. They analyzed species richness, looked at individual numbers within populations, and utilized diversity indices in N. nepalensis in both forest and meadow habitats. In looking at survey periods from both 2001 and 2006, they were able to create a six-year observational screening.

They found that communities of N. nepalensis were strongly influenced by various biotic and abiotic factors in both environments. However, they found greater species richness and individual numbers, as well as higher scores on the diversity indices for the forest habitat than the meadow habitat. This had important implications for conservation efforts in forest habitats by evaluating the long-term impact of climate change on species composition and population structure of N. nepalensis.

=== Preservation ===
In monitoring their existence and migration patterns within forest ecosystems, researchers have found that important decomposers like N. nepalensis are effectively changing how they both cycle nutrients but also interact with the biomass of vegetation available in their area. They are important for the conservation of ecosystems (both forest and meadow) due to their carcass recycling. By burying small carcasses and then consuming them, they speed up the decomposition process and help enrich the local soil. This, in turn, benefits the overall well-being of the ecosystem's health. Researchers monitoring their population is also invaluable since they are very sensitive to changes in the local environment. Thus, they act as effective indicator species to signal ecological imbalances.

== Behavioural ecology ==
N. nepalensis has been cited as an example of how unfavourable conditions promote cooperation in animal societies.
