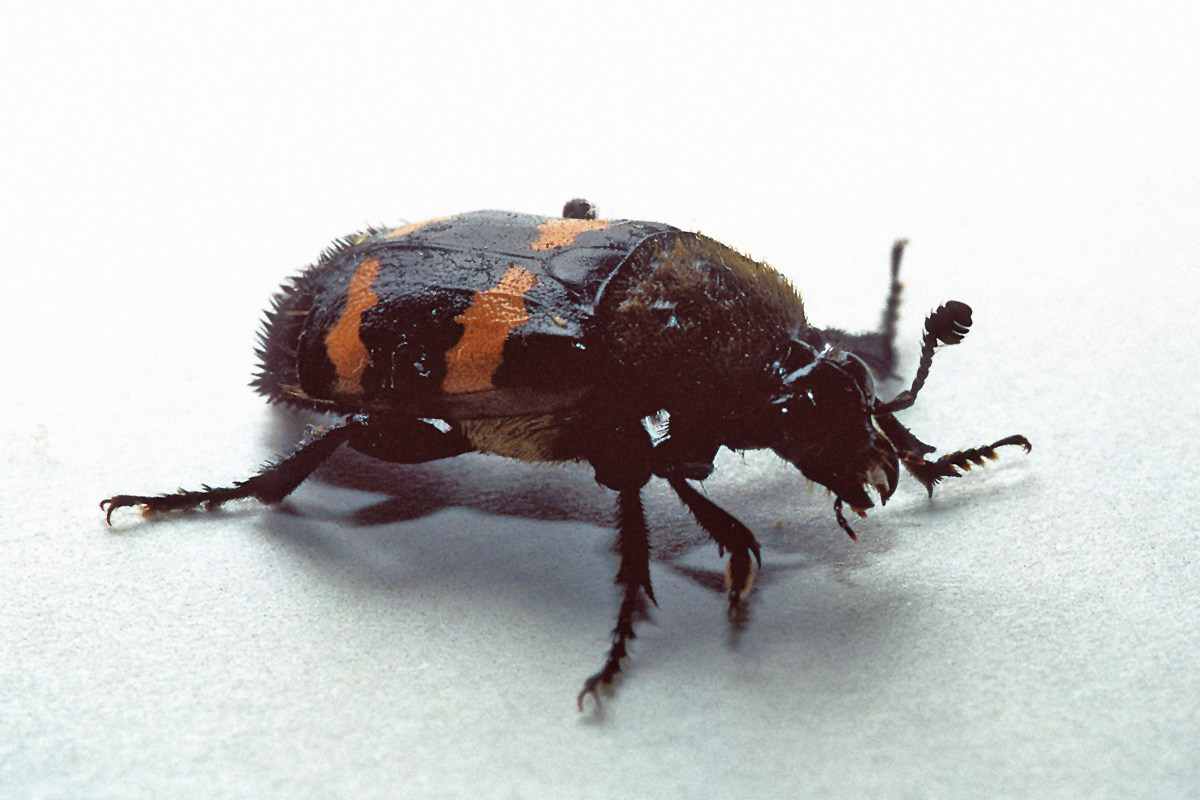

Scientific classification
- Kingdom: Animalia
- Phylum: Arthropoda
- Class: Insecta
- Order: Coleoptera
- Suborder: Polyphaga
- Infraorder: Staphyliniformia
- Family: Staphylinidae
- Genus: Nicrophorus
- Species: N. tomentosus

Binomial name
- Nicrophorus tomentosus Weber, 1801

Synonyms
- Nicrophorus vespillo v. "delta" Frölich 1792 (Unav.); Necrophorus [sic] tomentosus Weber, 1801; Necrophorus [sic] velutinus Fabricius, 1801; Necrophorus [sic] Requiescator Gistel, 1848; Necrophorus [sic] marginatus Gistel, 1857 (Preocc.); Necrophorus [sic] velutinus v. aurigaster Portevin, 1925

= Nicrophorus tomentosus =

Species of beetle

Nicrophorus tomentosus (gold-necked carrion beetle or tomentose burying beetle) is a species of burying beetle that was described by Friedrich Weber in 1801. The beetle belongs to the family Silphidae which are carrion beetles. The beetles have sensitive antennae that contain olfactory organs. Thus, the beetle can locate dead animals (carcass), and then as the name suggests, can bury them. However, unlike other burying beetles, N. tomentosus does not completely bury these brood carcasses. They instead dig a shallow hole under the carcass and cover it with leaf litter. Recognition of these beetles can be distinguished by its black color with orange markings on the wing covers (elytra).

== Classification ==
The genus name, Nicrophorus, means “death carrier”; tomentosus means "covered in short hair", referring to the pronotum.

== Description ==
There are several characteristics that differentiate Silphidae from other families. One characteristic is that N. tomentosus is about 11.2–19.0 millimeters in length. It also has a pair of striations on its fifth abdominal tergum. They also have a very large scutellum which can sometimes be as wide as its head. The segments of its antennae are all black, clubbed at the ends, and contain olfactory organs. The flight pattern of N. tomentosus is similar to that of a bumble bee. Its elytral epipleuron is completely black except for symmetrical orange splotches. The pronotum is also covered with a thick patch of golden yellow setae which sets it apart from other nicrophorus in its genus.

== Habitat and distribution ==
N. tomentosus are found in areas where there are carcasses. Carcasses can range anywhere from dead rodents to birds. Thus, forests, woodlands, shrub land, and sandy prairies are common areas where these beetles predominately thrive. The distribution of N. tomentosus is worldwide. However, in the western hemisphere it is located in the United States excluding the southeast region, and southern Canada that is east of the Rocky Mountains. N. tomentosus are seasonal. Thus they are only found in the months May through October, primarily in the months of July and August.

== Life cycle ==
The mating of the male and female N. tomentosus can begin anytime after a food source is found and buried. Mating is not particular to the carcass and can take place anywhere around it. When the eggs are laid they are then deposited into the nearby soil at a time at least twelve hours from the discovery of the carcass. Once the eggs hatch, after about four days, the larvae move towards the carcass to a feeding hole that was made by the parents. Both parents then feed the larvae regurgitated food for about six to eight days when the larvae are fully developed. The fully developed N. tomentosus then repeat the cycle after locating a new carcass and mate.

Recently, N. tomentosus was found to be one of at least two burying beetles which can breed in the forest canopy.

== Anatomy ==
The basic anatomy of the N. tomentosus is broken up into three separate functional body regions: the head, the thorax, and the abdomen. The entire body wall of N. tomentosus is called the exoskeleton. This tough outer layer provides strong protection and different areas where muscles can attach and provide movement. Their harder outer layer is made of cuticle yet the skin is broken up into many different hardened plates that are separated by sutures. This allows flexible movement and doesn’t cause it to move rigidly.

The head houses the brain, eyes, antennae, and mouth parts. The eyes are compound eyes which are lens-like in appearance and have a pixel-like reception. They are made up of thousands of little receptors called ommatidia. The antennae are covered with many chemical receptors and act as sensory organs. N. tomentosus has a mandible for chewing its food.

The thorax is the center of movement. It is separated into three different regions: the prothorax, the mesothorax, and the metathorax. It is heavily scleratized which provides extra support and acts as an anchor for moving parts. It is also divided into three different sections. The notum is the top most or dorsal area, the sternum is the lower or ventral side, and the pleuron is the sides where the legs are attached. The thorax is also the location of the wings. The N. tomentosus has a special hard shell like outer wings that protects and covers the delicate membranous hind wings that only emerge during flight. The thorax also houses the dorsal brain and ventral nervous system.

The abdomen is the last body region or the posterior area on the N. tomentosus. It houses the respiratory, circulatory, digestive, and reproductive systems. The spiracles, which are external openings that allow the N. tomentosus to breathe, are also found along the sides on the abdomen and are divided up into each segment.

== Diet ==
The diet of the N. tomentosus consists of small vertebrate animals. These include and are not limited to rats, moles, voles, and other rodents that the parents happen to find. Once the body is found the male and female remove any hair or feathers and roll the carcass into a ball. In order to preserve the carcass it is sprayed with a secretion from the anus because size and condition of the carcass determines how many eggs can be laid. The young eat regurgitated food from both parents and straight from the carcass. While feeding, the parents will protect the young from competitors and other burying beetles. The female will stay until the larvae are fully developed and then leave for another carcass.

== Interesting facts ==
This burying beetle exudes a very striking color pattern and displays very interesting behavior patterns. The behavior that these beetles are most noted for is the way they bury small vertebrate carcasses. This is done to ensure the survival of their offspring. These beetles put much time into their parental care. The males are just as involved as the females. The adult beetles stay and protect their eggs until they pupate and if the female dies the male will step in and pick up the extra workload. Another interesting feature of the burying beetles is the presence of a club. A club is an end segment of their antennae that is enlarged and flattened. This aids in the detection of odors emitted from decaying carcasses. When a suitable carcass is found the adult beetles will spread antibiotic secretions over it to remove bacteria and fungi. Also is if the carcass is large then sharing will occur between two male or female pairs or uneven numbers of females and males.

== Research ==
There have been several studies performed on N. tomemtosus in relation to its breeding habits. One major study was carried out to see how competition between flies and N. tomentosus would affect the brood size. What was discovered from these studies was that the existence or lack of oviposition by flies had an effect on the brood size of N. tomentosus present on the carcass. The fewer number of flies present on a decaying carcass the larger the brood size raised by the N. tomentosus beetles. Also the number of adult beetles present affected the brood size. The more female beetles present, the larger the number of young reared. Female beetles have a constraint on how many eggs they can lay due to timing however, male beetles do not have such a constraint and can impregnate several females. The one thing that wasn’t affected by the presence or absence of flies on a carcass was the amount of parental care administered.
