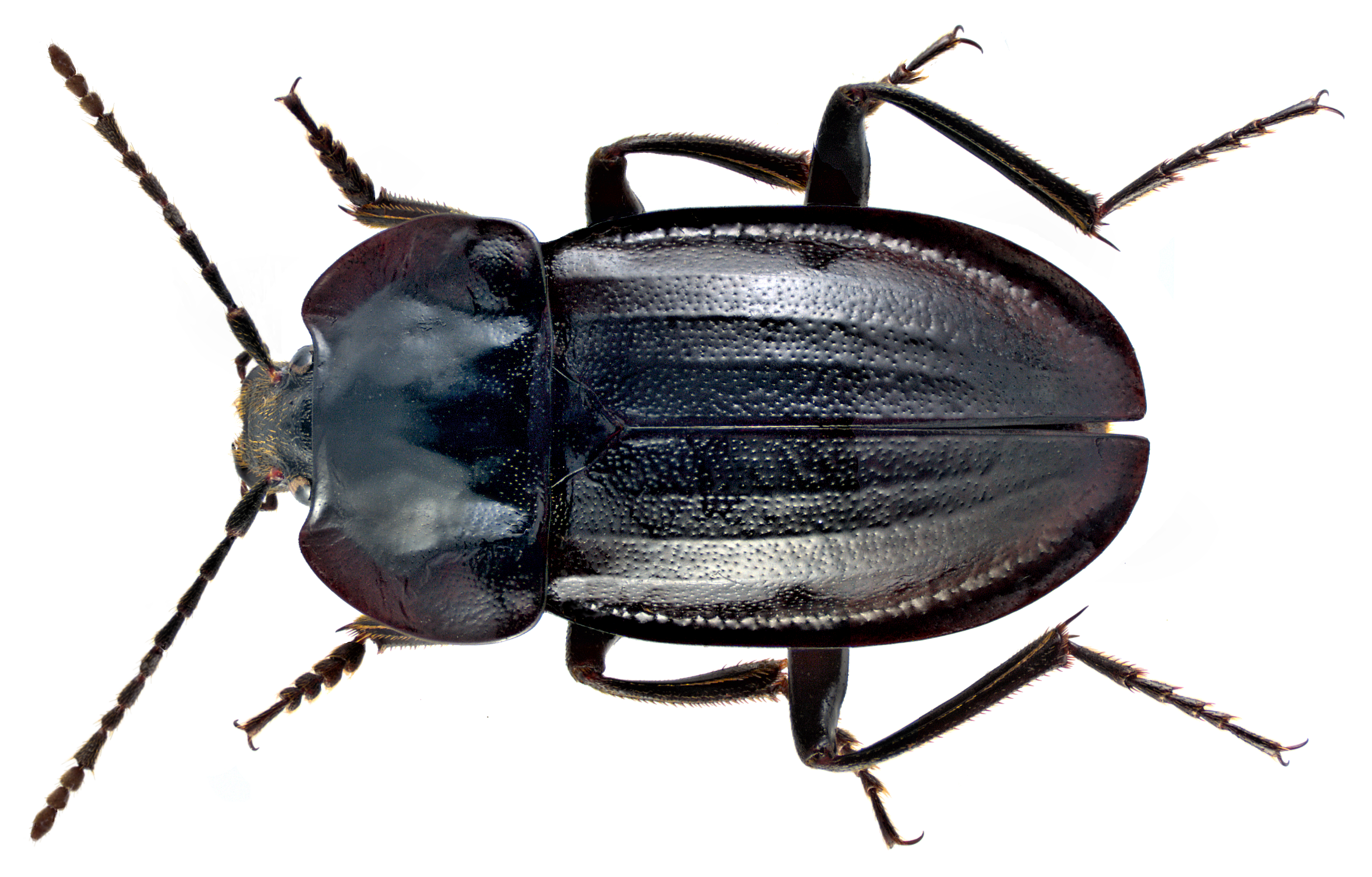
- Heterotemna simplicicornis

Scientific classification
- Kingdom: Animalia
- Phylum: Arthropoda
- Clade: Pancrustacea
- Class: Insecta
- Order: Coleoptera
- Suborder: Polyphaga
- Infraorder: Staphyliniformia
- Family: Staphylinidae
- Tribe: Silphini
- Genus: Heterotemna; Wollaston, 1864

= Heterotemna =

Genus of beetles

Heterotemna is a genus of carrion beetles in the tribe Silphini. Species in this genus are native to the Canary Islands. It contains the following species:

- Heterotemna britoi Garcia & Perez, 1996
- Heterotemna figurata Brulle, 1839
- Heterotemna tenuicornis Brulle, 1836
