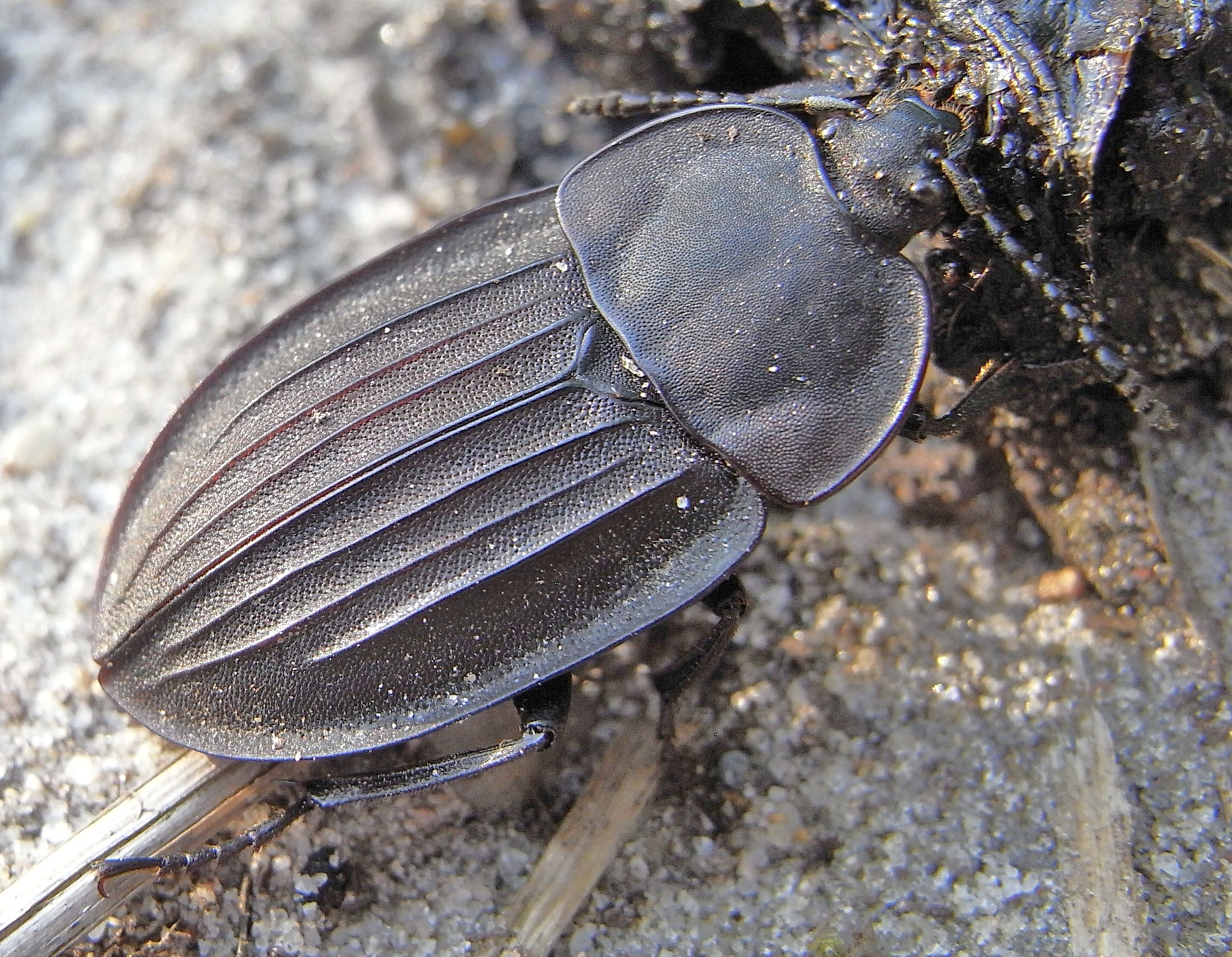
- Silpha carinata

Scientific classification
- Kingdom: Animalia
- Phylum: Arthropoda
- Clade: Pancrustacea
- Class: Insecta
- Order: Coleoptera
- Suborder: Polyphaga
- Infraorder: Staphyliniformia
- Family: Staphylinidae
- Tribe: Silphini
- Genus: Silpha; Linnaeus, 1758

Type species
- Silpha obscura Linnaeus, 1758

= Silpha =

Genus of beetles

Silpha is the type genus of the carrion beetles. These were formerly considered a distinct family but are now included in the Staphylinidae as subfamily Silphinae. This genus is native to the Old World, with one species introduced to Canada.

== Species ==
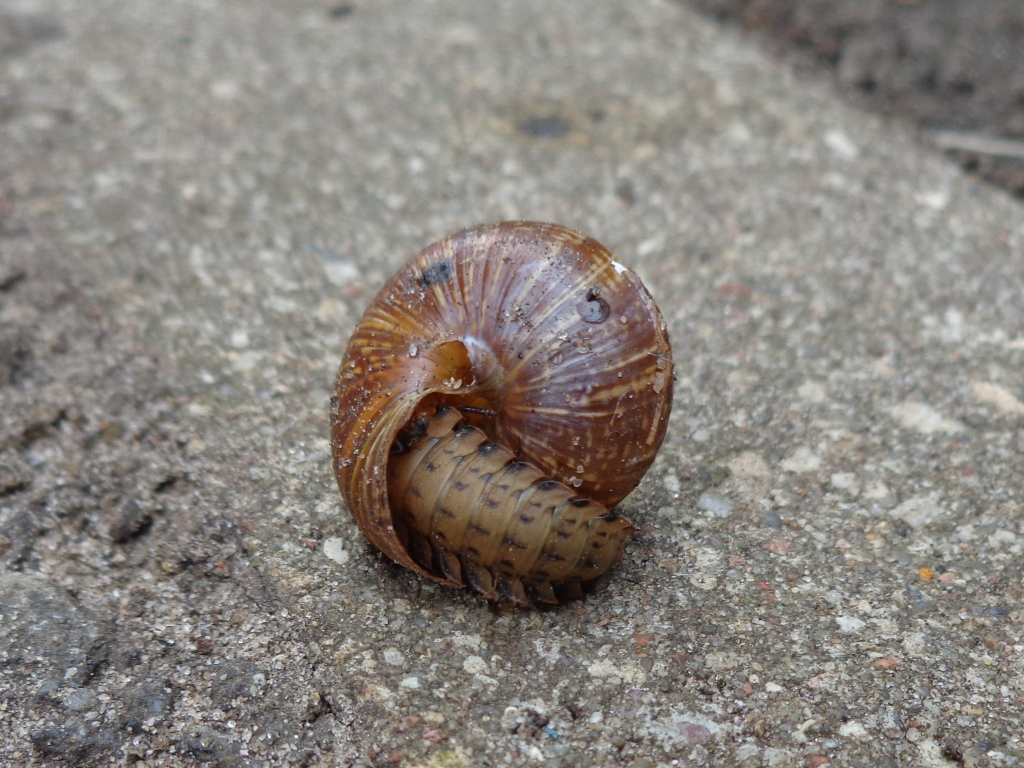
Larva of Silpha obscura entering a snail shell to feed

Most of the genus' historically recognized diversity occurs in Europe, with many proposed species having eventually been synonymized with the widespread S.carinata. For much of the 20th century, the genus was little studied taxonomically. However, starting with the work of Wolfgang Schawaller, a number of distinct species were newly described or revalidated in recent decades from eastern Asia and Africa, so it may well be that additional unrecognized species exist. As of 2025, the described species are:

- Silpha alpestris Kraatz, 1876
- Silpha businskyorum Háva, J.Schneider & Růžička, 1999
- Silpha capicola Péringuey, 1888 (= S.peringueyi, S.punctulata)
- Silpha carinata Herbst, 1783 (= S.armeniaca, S.atropurpurea, S.austriaca, S.bilineata, S.blattiformis, S.carpathica, S.croatica, S.griesbachiana, S.italica, S.jeanneli, S.recta, S.rufocincta, S.tatrica, S.trilineata)
- Silpha chelinda Sommer, Růžička & Barclay, 2025
- Silpha francoisi Dierkens, 2020
- Silpha khumbuensis Schawaller, 1982
- Silpha koreana Cho & Kwon, 1999
- Silpha lata Portevin, 1920
- Silpha longicornis Portevin, 1926 (= S.imitator, S.yamatona)
- Silpha martensi Emetz & Schawaller, 1975
- Silpha melanura Hope, 1831 (= S.nakanei)
- Silpha nepalica Emetz & Schawaller, 1975
- Silpha obscura Linnaeus, 1758 (= S.orientalis, S.validior)
- Silpha olivieri Bedel, 1887
- Silpha perforata Gebler, 1832
- Silpha puncticollis Lucas, 1846
- Silpha punctulata Gmelin, 1790
- Silpha qinlinga Schawaller, 1996
- Silpha schawalleri Háva, J.Schneider & Růžička, 1999
- Silpha tristis Illiger, 1798
- Silpha tyrolensis Laicharting, 1781

The Black Snail Beetle Phosphuga atrata was initially included in the present genus, and the supposed species S.fusca, S.nitida, S.paedemontana, S.punctata and S.shakotana are assigned to it today.

As Silpha is the type genus of its tribe Silphini and the entire carrion beetle subfamily Silphinae, other related beetles were occasionally placed here, e.g. Ablattaria laevigata. Even the darkling beetle Asida maura, Glischrochilus quadripunctatus (a sap beetle, family Nitidulidae), Kateretes pedicularius (a short-winged flower beetle, family Kateretidae), Peltis ferruginea of family Peltidae, or Megalodacne indica and Triplax russica of the Erotylidae (pleasing fungus beetles), were at first placed in Silpha, although they all properly belong to the Cucujiformia, an entirely distinct infraorder than the carrion beetles.

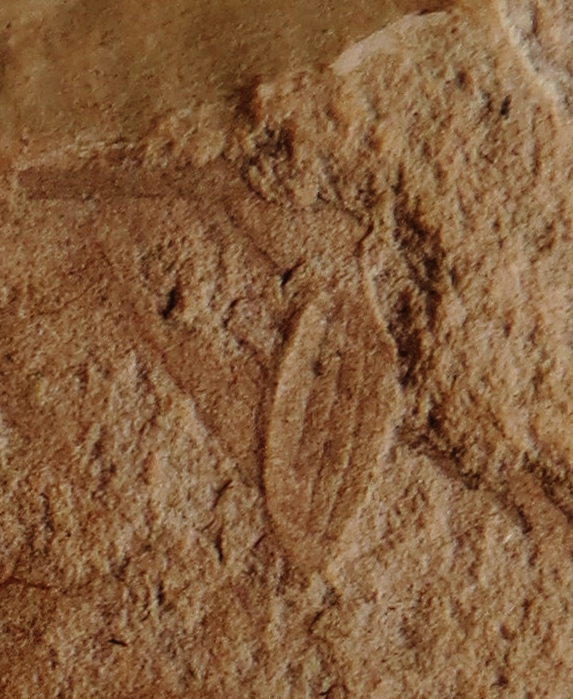
Silpha tricostata fossil, about 12.5 million years old

In addition, some prehistoric Silpha species have been named from fossil remains. The genus is attested as much as 25 million years ago at the end of the Oligocene, while an even older record around 35 million years ago is of more uncertain affiliations. The fossil species, sorted by decreasing age, are:

- †Silpha beutenmuelleri Wickham, 1914 (disputed) – Priabonian
- †Silpha stratuum Germar, 1837 – Chattian
- †Silpha obsoleta Heer, 1847 – Serravallian
- †Silpha tricostata Heer, 1862 – Serravallian

Living species are attested by remains from the mid-Pleistocene onwards.
