= Gaston Portevin =

French naturalist (1869–1946)

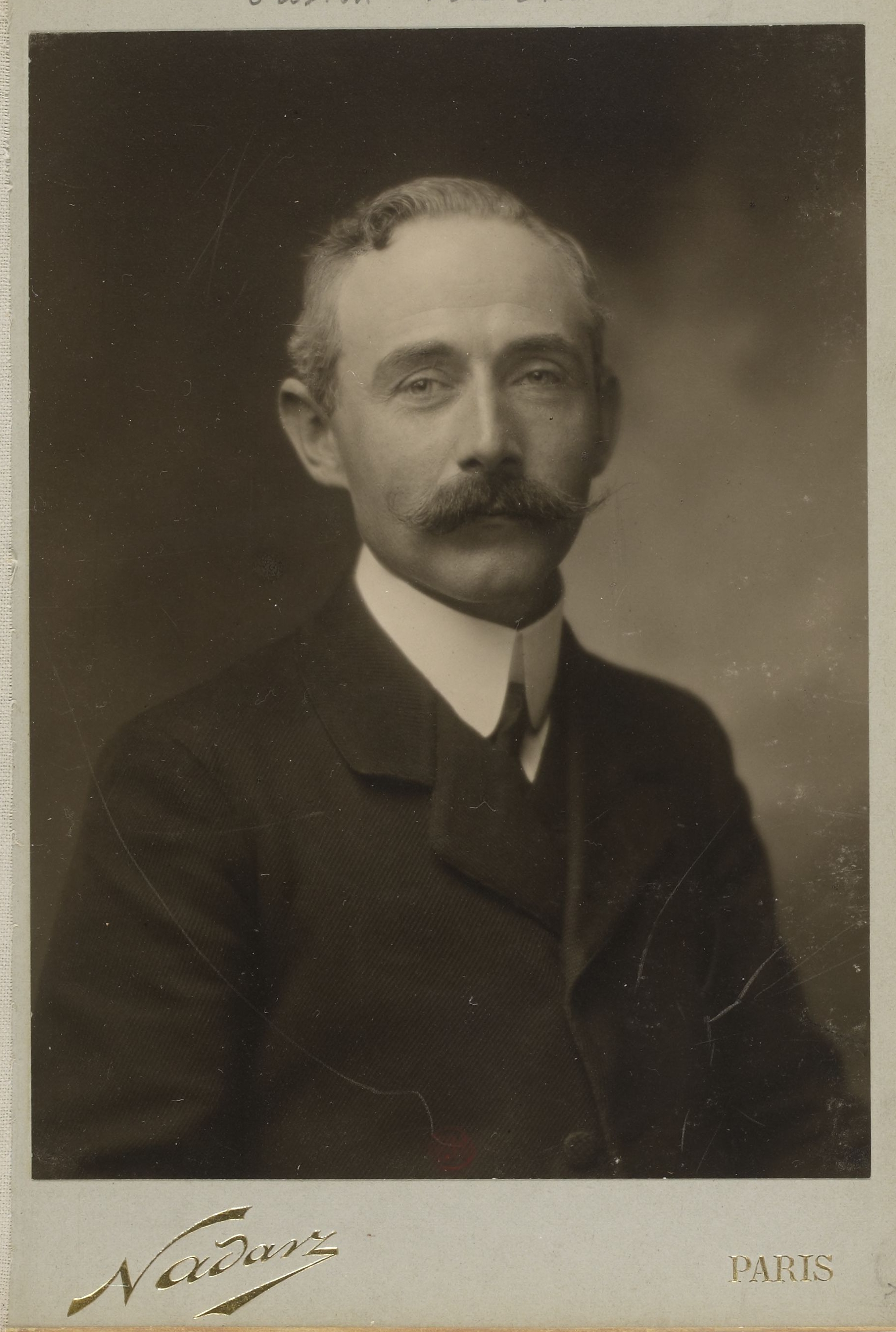

Gaston Portevin (1869–1946) was a French naturalist and entomologist. He specialized in beetles and wrote several books including a monograph of the Silphidae, which he called "necrophages".

== Early life ==
Portevin was born in Évreux. His brother Henri Portevin (1874–1945) was also a naturalist and entomologist. He worked as a bank manager in Marne.

== Entomology ==
He was introduced into entomology by Maurice Auguste Régimbart. He collected beetles extensively, became a part of the Paris beetle-collecting circle and became a subscriber of the Miscellanea Entomologica. He was a friend of publisher Paul Lechevalier through whom he produced several books on beetles. Portevin produced a key to the French Cerambycidae in 1927. Another major work was Histoire naturelle des coléoptères de France which he wrote from 1929 to 1935 which sought to be an exhaustive catalogue of all the beetles of France.

He also collected diptera and wrote on a variety of natural history topics including reviews of books, mushrooms, edible insects, interesting plants, and sea grasses. His collection of Silphidae was acquired by Maurice Pic. Portevin's younger brother Henri was also interested in beetles.
