= Allopliosilpha =

Scientific classification
- Kingdom: Animalia
- Phylum: Arthropoda
- Clade: Pancrustacea
- Class: Insecta
- Order: Coleoptera
- Suborder: Polyphaga
- Infraorder: Staphyliniformia
- Family: Staphylinidae
- Genus: †Allopliosilpha
- Species: †A. inclavata

Binomial name
- †Allopliosilpha inclavata Gersdorf, 1971

Extinct genus of beetle

Allopliosilpha inclavata is an extinct species of carrion beetle that lived during the Middle Pliocene. First described scientifically by Gersdorf in 1971, A. inclavata is the only species in the genus Allopliosilpha.
