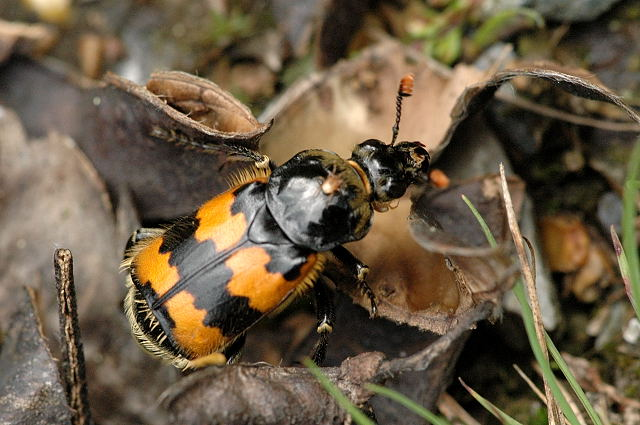
- Nicrophorus vespillo

Scientific classification
- Kingdom: Animalia
- Phylum: Arthropoda
- Clade: Pancrustacea
- Class: Insecta
- Order: Coleoptera
- Suborder: Polyphaga
- Infraorder: Staphyliniformia
- Superfamily: Staphylinoidea
- Family: Staphylinidae
- Subfamily: Silphinae; Latreille, 1806

Tribes
- Nicrophorini Kirby, 1837; Silphini Latreille, 1806

= Silphinae =

Silphinae Temporal range: Middle Jurassic–Present

Family of beetles

Silphinae is a subfamily of rove beetles that are also known commonly as large carrion beetles, carrion beetles or burying beetles. There are two tribes: Silphini and Nicrophorini. Members of Nicrophorini are sometimes known as burying beetles or sexton beetles. The number of species is relatively small, at around two hundred. They are more diverse in the temperate region although a few tropical endemics are known. Both tribes feed on decaying organic matter such as dead animals. The tribes differ in which uses parental care and which types of carcasses they prefer. Silphini are considered to be of importance to forensic entomologists because when they are found on a decaying body they are used to help estimate a post-mortem interval.

Traditionally, the subfamily Silphinae was classified as its own family, Silphidae, but multiple lines of evidence show that they evolved from within the family Staphylinidae.

== Taxonomy, evolution, and etymology ==
The subfamily Silphinae belongs to the family Staphylinidae in the order Coleoptera. They are commonly referred to as carrion beetles or burying beetles and are usually associated with carrion, fungi, and dung. In the past, members of the family Agyrtidae were included. This subfamily has two tribes, Silphini and Nicrophorini. The antenna is made up of 15 segments and is capitate (ending in an abruptly capped club) in the Nicrophorini and has a more gradual club shape in the Silphini. The tribes also differ in behavior. Members of the tribe Silphini show little to no care for their young and breed on large carrion. Nicrophorini breed on small animal carrion and will bury themselves and their food to rear their offspring in a bi-parental manner. There are approximately 183 species in this subfamily, which are found worldwide although they are more common in temperate regions. Nicrophorus americanus, known as the American burying beetle, is an endangered species.

The oldest fossils of silphids are known from the Middle Jurassic (~ 163 million years ago) Daohugou Bed in Northern China. Many Silphinae are flightless although they have wings. This loss is thought to be a result due to the changes in habitat over time. Researchers have found that most flight-capable species in this group feed on vertebrate carcasses, whereas flightless species will feed on soil invertebrates. They also found that egg production increased with flight loss because of a more limited food supply.

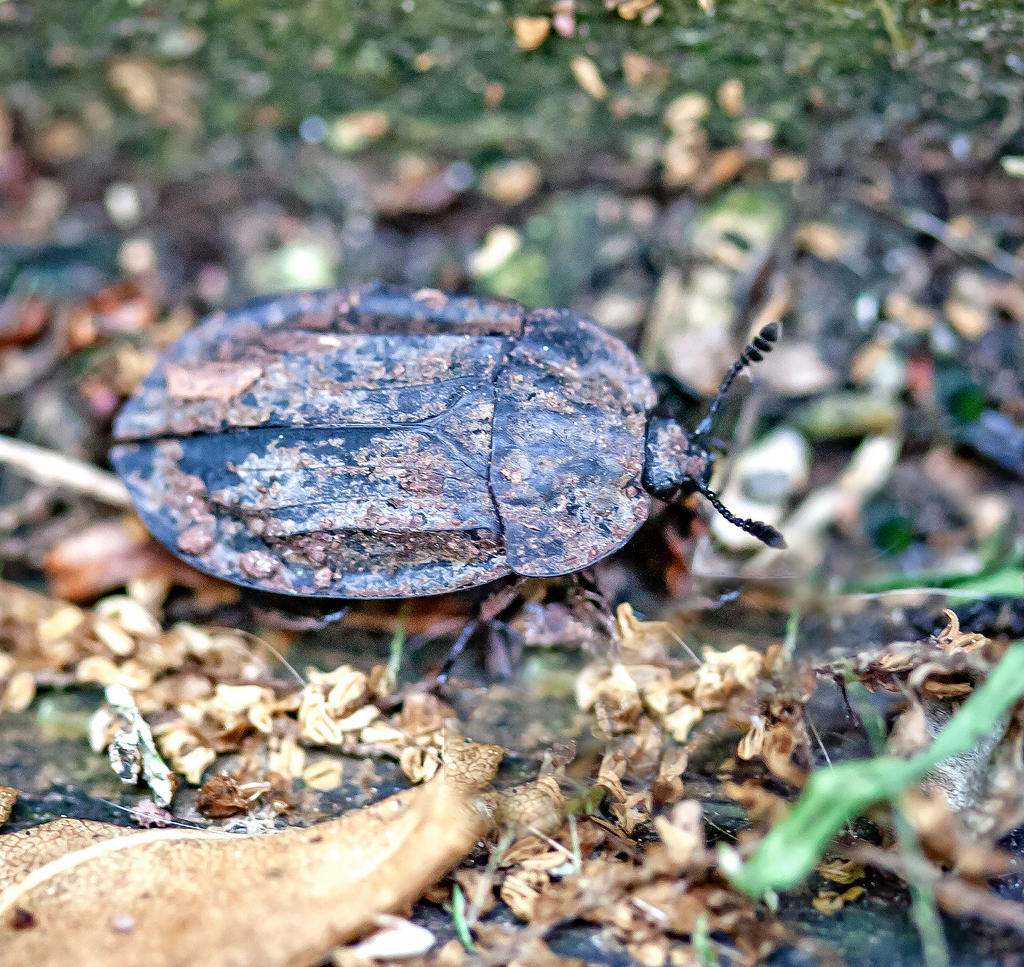
Ridged Carrion Beetle (Oiceoptoma inaequale)

The word "silphid" or "sylph", first seen in the sixteenth century in Paracelsus' works, refers to any race of spirits inhabiting the air and is described as mortal, but lacking soul. The word is also related to the Latin word silva meaning "forests" or "of the woods".

== Diversity and distribution ==
Silphinae are ubiquitous and are most abundant in the temperate zone. The diversity is also greater in the temperate zone and they are quite rare in the tropics although there are species endemic to the region. It is thought that ants, flies and other carrion feeders outcompete them in these regions. They vary in size from 7 to 45 mm.

There are about 46 different species of Silphinae in North America which include Heterosilpha ramosa, Necrodes surinamensis, Necrophila americana, Nicrophorus americanus, Nicrophorus carolinus, Nicrophorus investigator, Nicrophorus marginatus, Nicrophorus orbicollis, Nicrophorus tomentosus, Oiceoptoma inaequale, Oiceoptoma noveboracense, Oiceoptoma rugulosum, Thanatophilus lapponicus. A species found in Great Britain is Oiceoptoma thoracicum.

One species of Nicrophorus, Nicrophorus nepalensis, can be found primarily in the mountains of eastern Asia as well as along the Malay Archipelago. Nicrophorus nepalensis are found in the Indian subcontinent as well in the countries of India and Pakistan.

== Development ==
Silphinae undergo holometabolous development. The development in the tribe Silphini proceeds at a slower rate than in Nicrophorini. The Silphini life cycle takes approximately 26 to 58 days to go from an egg to adult. The breakdown of this process is essential to forensic entomologists. Eggs take two to seven days to hatch. The larvae will develop through three instars on the carrion lasting for 10 to 30 days. After that time period is up the third instar larvae will venture away from the detritus to pupate. Pupation takes 14 to 21 days; during this stage the wings become fully developed and sexual maturity is reached, sometimes called the imago or adult stage where the cycle is then repeated. The life cycle of the Nicrophorini is generally quicker. Oviposition is done near the carcass and eggs take 12 to 48 hours to hatch into larvae. The amount of food and parental care exhibited help determine the length of the larval stage. Pupation in this subfamily lasts six to eight days and is completed in the soil. The adult Nicrophorine will emerge from the soil and venture to find food and a mate.

== Reproduction ==
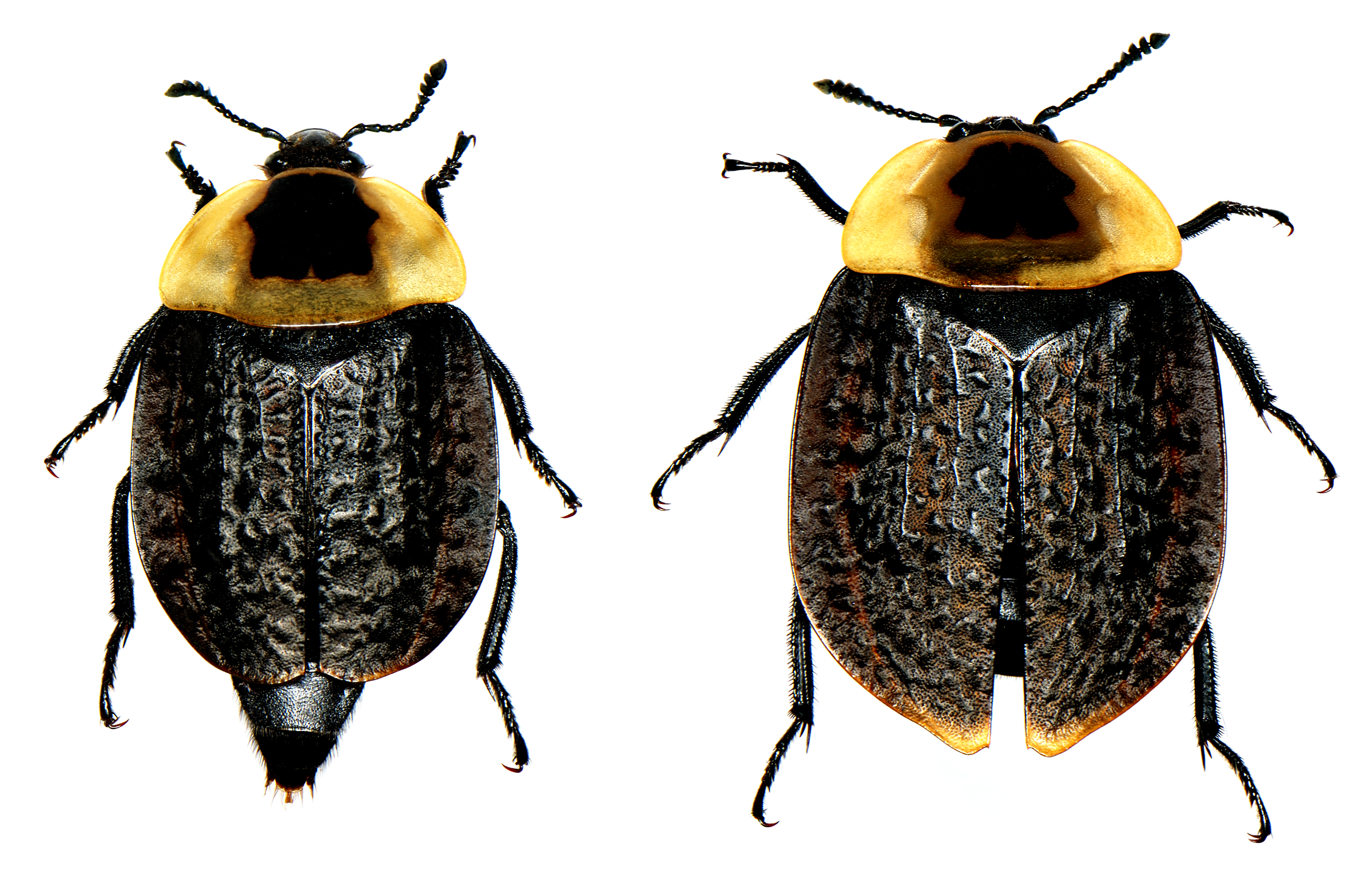
Male (left) and female Necrophila americana

Nicrophorini are well known for the habit of locating a carcass and burying it by unearthing the soil underneath it. The burying behavior has seemingly evolved to prevent competition from other insects such as fly maggots. It has been observed that the cooperation of the two parent beetles leads to breeding success. More likely than not a breeding pair will work together, but in cases where there is large carrion males try to boost their reproduction by emitting pheromones. In this way, he will father more offspring, but the reproductive success of the primary female steadily declines. Sometimes, where there is a large carcass the likelihood of intense competition from flies leads to communal breeding. There appears to be a truce between females who would normally compete for the males, and in these cases cooperative behavior extends to females caring for each other's offspring. At the height of breeding season pairs of beetles may compete for the carrion. The losing pair will be ejected from the carrion and if any eggs have been laid they are killed so the new female can lay her own.

== Behavior and ecology ==
=== Food ===
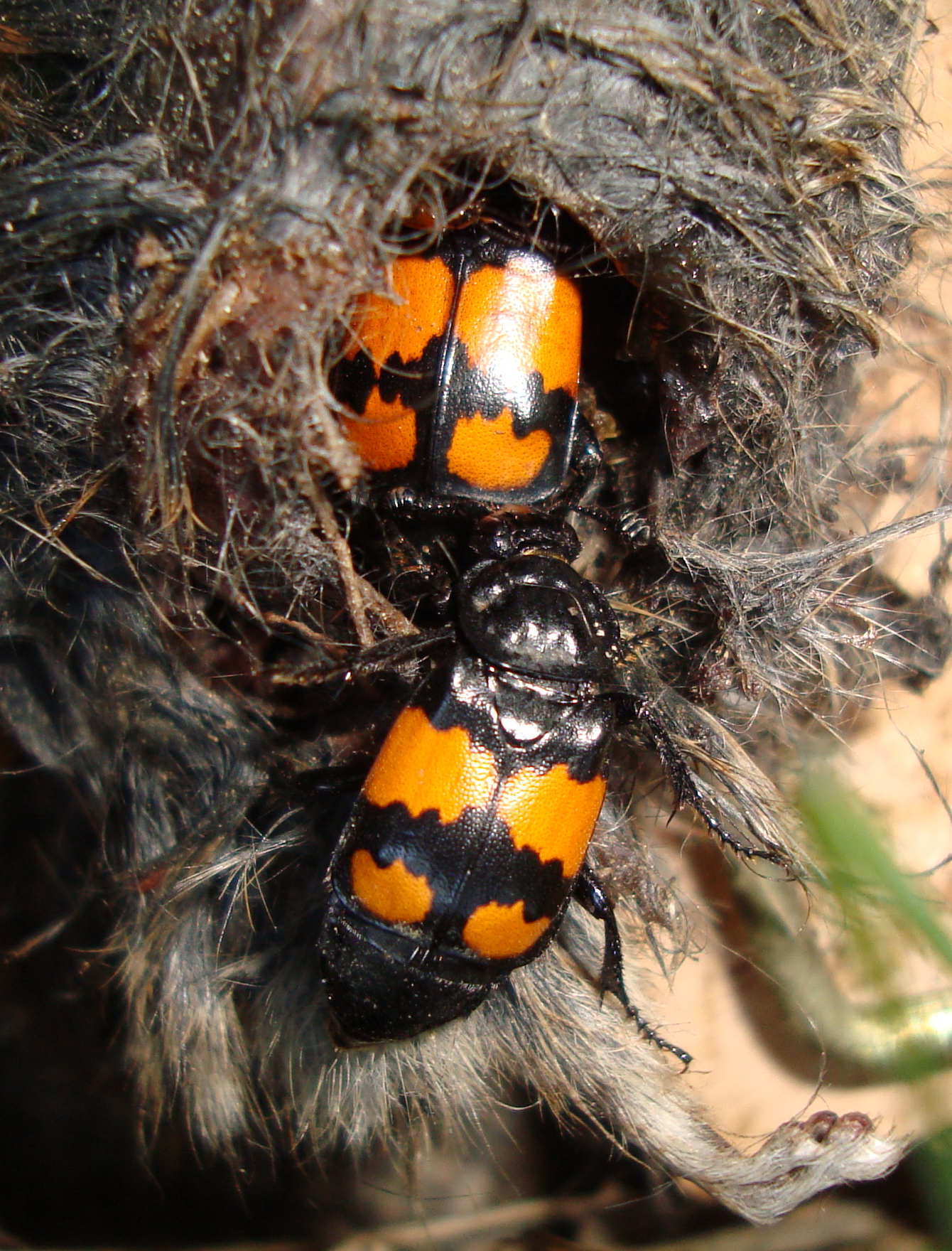
Nicrophorus vespilloides colonizing a dead rodent.

Silphid adults feed in a saprophagous manner: they colonize the carrion during all four stages of decomposition, which are fresh, bloated, decay, and dry. The main areas of decomposition for adults are during both the bloated and decaying stages. Silphid larvae mainly inhabit during the decaying and dry stages of the carrion. The primary food source for the tribe Silphini is the maggot mass present on the detritus. Nicrophorini will colonize the body earlier in decomposition in order to avoid competition with maggots. If there is a sufficiently large maggot mass they will not colonize the carcass. The parental care exhibited by this tribe is that the adult beetles regurgitate food into the mouths of the young larvae until they are mature. Silphini colonize later in the decaying process and the adults eat the maggot mass, sometimes leaving little maggot evidence left to estimate a post-mortem interval. In the case of the sexton or burying beetles, Nicrophorini, the adults will bury small animal carcasses and lay their eggs on it. In some species, a slight depression is made on the detritus for maturing larvae that the adult beetles feed and protect. In both tribes the larvae are observed to eat the decaying organic material while the adults mainly consume the maggots. Flies are the major competitor of silphids for detritus. If a carcass is infested with maggots, many of the Nicrophorini will abandon the carcass while members of Silphini will feed on the maggots.

=== Defense ===
Beetles have many different weapons available to protect them against predator attacks. The members of Silphinae have many different modifications that allow them to thrive in different ecological niches including colour warnings (from aposematism to Batesian mimicry), chemical defenses and parental care. Silphines are usually dark in color consisting of gold, black and brown. This dark coloring allows them to blend into their environment. Many nicrophorini have bright orange coloring on their elytra, which may serve as a warning to other predators. Some species secrete a chemical from a rectal gland that consists of aliphatic acids and terpene alcohols. The secretion has a strong, foul odor and may be topically irritating to cockroaches and flies. The species Necrodes surinamensis ejects this secretion as a spray and can rotate the end of its abdomen to spray in all directions.

=== Locomotion and navigation ===
Walking is the primary form of locomotion for Silphinae. They are able to travel great distances to find carcasses to breed and feed on. Beetles also have two sets of wings, the elytra and the hind wings. The hind wings are membranous and are modified for flying or swimming. There are some Silphinae who are able to fly, but others have lost this ability throughout evolution. When an animal dies, hydrogen sulfide and some cyclic compounds are released. Silphinae use their sense of smell to locate carcasses from a long distance by chemoreceptors on their antennae, which are adapted to detect these chemicals. At a short distance, the end organs of the palpi detect the odors. Silphid beetles are usually more active at night, nocturnal, which may help reduce competition.

=== Competition ===
Competition from other organisms for the carrion puts the silphids at both an advantage and a disadvantage. The advantage is that fly competitors lay eggs that result in maggots and supply food for silphids. The disadvantage for the Nicrophorini is that if the carcass is already "blown", referring to Shakespearean time as being infected with fly maggots, they will not colonize. Nicrophorini have adapted to these situations and will bury the carcass to remove it from other competitors. With this technique, a steady food source is available for the larvae and procreation chances increase.

Silphinae compete for brooding areas. If an invader male overpowers the original male, it will mate with the original female and create a new brood. If an invader female overpowers the original female, it will also create a new brood with the primary male.

== Relationships ==
=== With humans ===
Silphids are usually not considered a nuisance to humans. They help the environment by laying their eggs on carcasses and the larvae break down the detritus, which prevents accumulation of deceased organisms.

Carcasses are kept out of sight and foul odors are prevented when Nicrophorini bury it under the ground. This will also reduce the surface area for flies to lay their eggs and decrease fly population.

Some Silphinae species inhabit human-occupied areas and become pests to farmers by using crops as an additional source of nutrients. In Europe, Aclypea opaca feeds on beets, while Necrophila americana feeds on pumpkins, spinach, and sugar beets.

=== Other organisms ===
Members from the subfamily Silphinae are known to have mutualistic relationships with other organisms. Nicrophorini have a mutual relationship with phoretic mites. Mites from the genus Poecilochirus produce deutonymphs that crawl on Nicrophorini and are transported to carrion. Once they arrive at the carrion, deutonymphs leave the adult Nicrophorini and proceed to feed on nearby fly eggs and immature larvae. Mites help Nicrophorini reduce the number of competitors on carrion. With less competition, both species are able to reproduce successfully underground.

Silphinae are known for being hosts to juvenile nematodes. Nicrophorus vespilloides are closely associated with the nematode parasite. The parasites can be easily transmitted to other hosts during copulation.

== Forensic research ==
Silphinae are one of several insect taxa of forensic importance in the order Coleoptera. They are a very important tool in determining a post-mortem interval (PMI) by collecting Silphid progeny from the carcass, and determining the developmental rate. Based on the number of instars and the larval development stage, a time of death can be estimated. This is very useful in medicocriminal entomology, the emphasis on utilizing arthropods as evidence to aid in solving crimes. Many of the methods in determining stages of development are subjective. However, recent studies have found a more precise way of determining the stage of development of Silphid larvae by measuring the maximum cranial width and other heavily sclerotized areas of the larvae instead of measuring just the length, which is subject to change with each larva, particularly in O. inaequale and N. surinamensis, which are more robust and have greater variations of length. The most accurate instar identification is possible by using distinct morphological features that are instar specific and cannot be affected by the size of the specimen. Although this is possible only for few species with described larvae of all instars, such as Thanatophilus rugosus.

Silphinae are being studied to find more exact estimations of post-mortem intervals and possible manners of death. Also, in the future, entomologists will explore the social behavior of the beetles to a greater degree. Members of Silphinae are typically the first of the coleopterans to come in contact with carrion. Silphinae larvae are opportunistic predators that will feed on dipteran eggs, larvae, and on the carcass itself. This presents a problem in the determination of post-mortem interval because Silphinae are known to eradicate other species from carrion. By eliminating the first colonizing species Silphinae can give an incorrect post-mortem interval.

Unlike most of the insects used as forensic markers, it is possible to assess if Silphinae adults have colonized a corpse and left it later. For this purpose, some Parasitidae mites (for example, Poecilochirus species) are used due to their phoront-host specificity. If a corpse is invaded by Poecilochirus specimens and no Silphinae were sampled by forensic entomologists, it is reasonable to suspect that some Silphinae carrying Poecilochirus phoretic instars arrived previously to the corpse and abandoned it some time later, leaving Poecilochirus mites in the process.

== Tribes and genera ==
- Necrodini Portevin, 1926
  - Diamesus Hope, 1840
  - Necrodes Leach, 1815
- Silphini Latreille, 1806
  - Ablattaria Reitter, 1884
  - Aclypea Reitter, 1884
  - Dendroxena Motschulsky, 1858
  - Heterosilpha Portevin, 1926
  - Heterotemna Wollaston, 1864
  - Necrophila Kirby & Spence, 1828
  - Oiceoptoma Leach, 1815
  - Oxelytrum Gistel, 1848
  - Phosphuga Leach, 1817
  - Ptomaphila Kirby & Spence, 1828
  - Silpha Linnaeus, 1758
  - Thanatophilus Leach, 1815
  - †Allopliosilpha Gersdorf, 1969
  - †Pliosilpha Gersdorf, 1970
