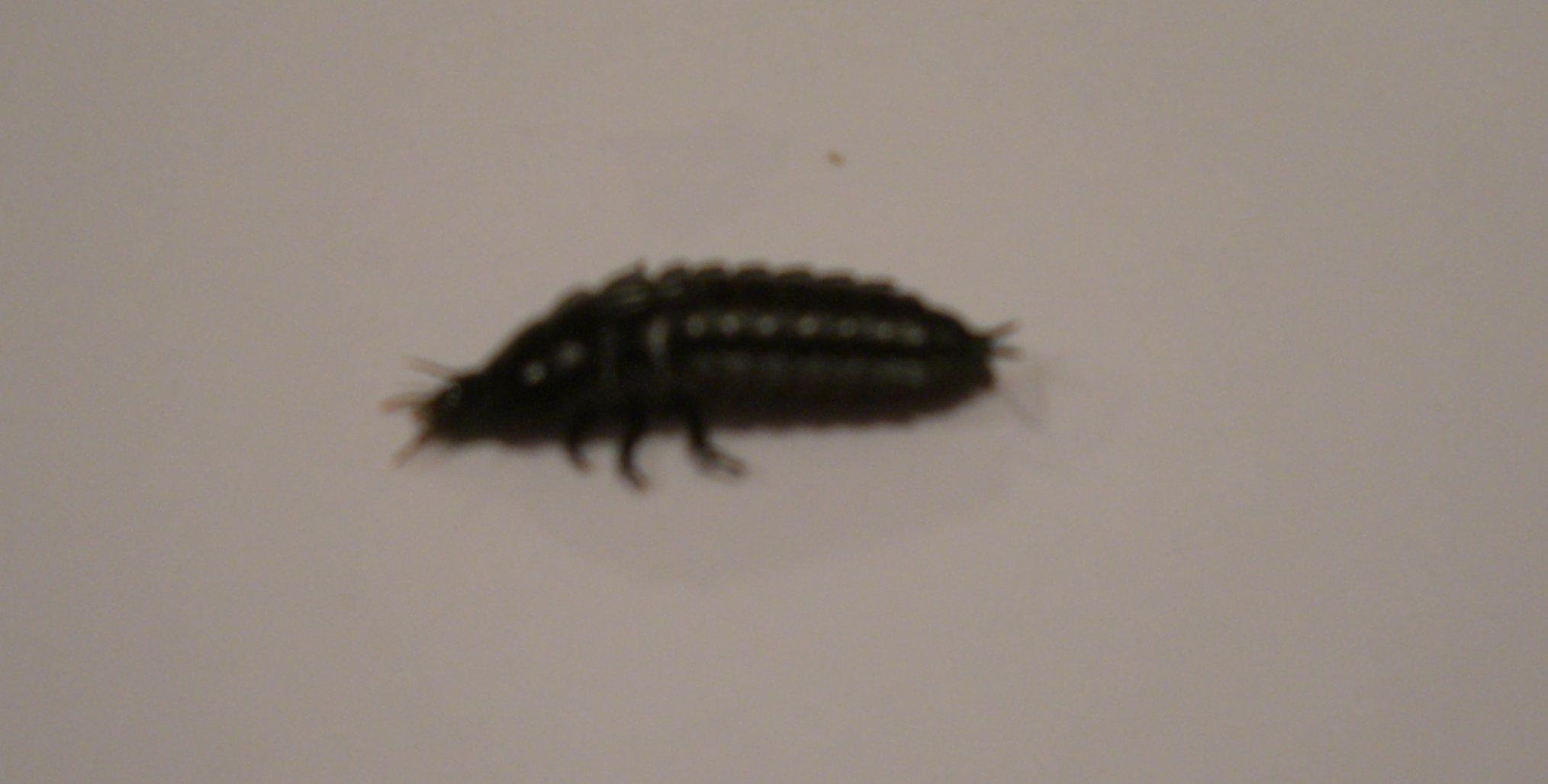

Scientific classification
- Kingdom: Animalia
- Phylum: Arthropoda
- Clade: Pancrustacea
- Class: Insecta
- Order: Coleoptera
- Suborder: Polyphaga
- Infraorder: Staphyliniformia
- Family: Staphylinidae
- Genus: Ablattaria
- Species: A. arenaria

Binomial name
- Ablattaria arenaria (Kraatz, 1876)

Synonyms
- Silpha arenaria (Kraatz, 1876); Phosphuga arenaria Kraatz, 1876

= Ablattaria arenaria =

Species of beetle

Ablattaria arenaria, the snail hunter, is a beetle in the carrion beetle family Silphidae which preys on snails. It is native to the eastern Mediterranean. Adults become active in the spring, and the activity's start time is influenced by relative humidity.
