= Phytoecia cinerascens =

Scientific classification
- Domain: Eukaryota
- Kingdom: Animalia
- Phylum: Arthropoda
- Class: Insecta
- Order: Coleoptera
- Suborder: Polyphaga
- Infraorder: Cucujiformia
- Family: Cerambycidae
- Genus: Phytoecia
- Species: P. cinerascens

Binomial name
- Phytoecia cinerascens Kraatz, 1882

Synonyms
- Coptosia cinerascens (Kraatz, 1882); Phytoecia sokolovi Semenov, 1895

Species of beetle

Phytoecia cinerascens is a species of beetle in the family Cerambycidae. It was first described by Kraatz in 1882. It is known from Kazakhstan, Turkmenistan, Kyrgyzstan, Afghanistan, Tajikistan, and Uzbekistan.
