= Amblymelanoplia kraatzi =

Scientific classification
- Kingdom: Animalia
- Phylum: Arthropoda
- Class: Insecta
- Order: Coleoptera
- Suborder: Polyphaga
- Infraorder: Scarabaeiformia
- Family: Scarabaeidae
- Genus: Amblymelanoplia
- Species: A. kraatzi

Binomial name
- Amblymelanoplia kraatzi Dombrow, 2022

Species of beetle

Amblymelanoplia kraatzi is a species of beetle of the family Scarabaeidae. It is found in South Africa (Western Cape).

== Description ==
Adults reach a length of about 9.6 mm. They are dull black, with the antennae and legs dark red-brown and the elytra blackish red-brown. The clypeus and the head have brown setae, while the pronotum has pale-brown setae and brown setae on the lateral and anterior margins. The elytra have pale-brown setae.

== Etymology ==
The species is dedicated to Ernst Gustav Kraatz, founder of the Senckenberg German Entomological Institute Müncheberg.
