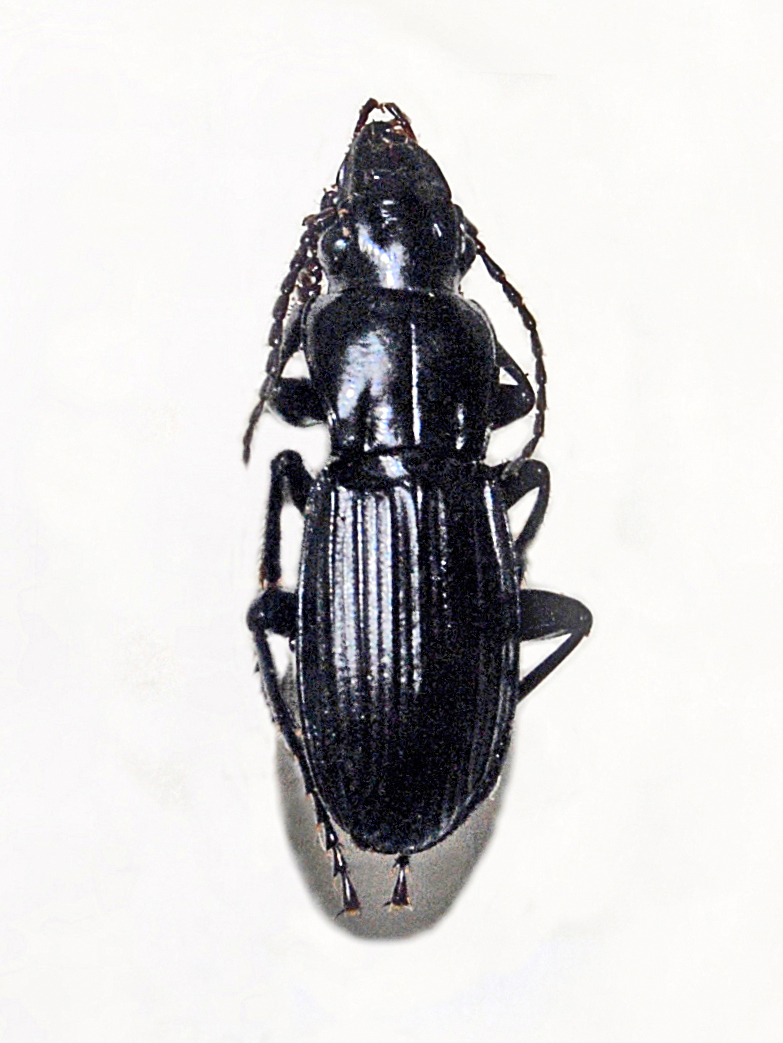

Scientific classification
- Domain: Eukaryota
- Kingdom: Animalia
- Phylum: Arthropoda
- Class: Insecta
- Order: Coleoptera
- Suborder: Adephaga
- Family: Carabidae
- Genus: Percus
- Species: P. villae

Binomial name
- Percus villae Kraatz, 1858

Synonyms
- Percus (Percus) villae (Kraatz, 1858); Feronia (Percus) villae Kraatz, 1858

= Percus villae =

Species of beetle

Percus villae is a species of beetles in the family Carabidae. Its length is about 23–25 mm (11/12–1 in).

== Distribution ==
This species is endemic to southwestern Alps of France and Italy.
