= Leptorhabdium illyricum =

Conservation status
- Data Deficient (IUCN 3.1)

Scientific classification
- Kingdom: Animalia
- Phylum: Arthropoda
- Class: Insecta
- Order: Coleoptera
- Suborder: Polyphaga
- Infraorder: Cucujiformia
- Family: Cerambycidae
- Genus: Leptorhabdium
- Species: L. illyricum

Binomial name
- Leptorhabdium illyricum (Kraatz, 1870)

Species of beetle

Leptorhabdium illyricum is a species of the Lepturinae subfamily in the long-horned beetle family. This beetle is distributed in Bosnia and Herzegovina, Croatia, Greece, Italy, Montenegro, North Macedonia, and in Slovenia.
