= Amblymelanoplia pseudocostata =

Scientific classification
- Kingdom: Animalia
- Phylum: Arthropoda
- Class: Insecta
- Order: Coleoptera
- Suborder: Polyphaga
- Infraorder: Scarabaeiformia
- Family: Scarabaeidae
- Genus: Amblymelanoplia
- Species: A. pseudocostata

Binomial name
- Amblymelanoplia pseudocostata Dombrow, 2022

Species of beetle

Amblymelanoplia pseudocostata is a species of beetle of the family Scarabaeidae. It is found in South Africa (Western Cape). The habitat consists of Boland Granite Fynbos.

== Description ==
Adults reach a length of about 9.5 mm (0.37 in). They are mostly dull black, with the elytra and legs dark red brown. The clypeus and head have red-brown setae. The pronotum has brown setae and some white scales at the posterior margin. The elytra have pale-brown setae.

== Etymology ==
The species name is refers to its similarity to Amblymelanoplia costata.
