= Amblymelanoplia paraunidentata =

Scientific classification
- Kingdom: Animalia
- Phylum: Arthropoda
- Class: Insecta
- Order: Coleoptera
- Suborder: Polyphaga
- Infraorder: Scarabaeiformia
- Family: Scarabaeidae
- Genus: Amblymelanoplia
- Species: A. paraunidentata

Binomial name
- Amblymelanoplia paraunidentata Dombrow, 2022

Species of beetle

Amblymelanoplia paraunidentata is a species of beetle of the family Scarabaeidae. It is found in South Africa (Western Cape). The habitat consists of Boland Granite Fynbos.

== Description ==
Adults reach a length of about 10.3 mm (0.41 in). They are mostly dull black, with the elytra and legs blackish red-brown. The clypeus has red-brown setae, while the setae on the head are brown. The pronotum has brown setae and some white scales at the posterior margin. The elytra have brown setae.

== Etymology ==
The species name refers to its similarity to Amblymelanoplia unidentata.
