= Amblymelanoplia pseudounidentata =

Scientific classification
- Kingdom: Animalia
- Phylum: Arthropoda
- Class: Insecta
- Order: Coleoptera
- Suborder: Polyphaga
- Infraorder: Scarabaeiformia
- Family: Scarabaeidae
- Genus: Amblymelanoplia
- Species: A. pseudounidentata

Binomial name
- Amblymelanoplia pseudounidentata Dombrow, 2022

Species of beetle

Amblymelanoplia pseudounidentata is a species of beetle of the family Scarabaeidae. It is found in South Africa (Western Cape). The habitat consists of Boland Granite Fynbos.

== Description ==
Adults reach a length of about 9.6–9.7 mm (0.38–0.38 in). They are mostly dull black. The clypeus and head have red-brown setae. The pronotum has brown setae, as well as some white scales and red-brown setae at the lateral and posterior margins. The elytra have brown setae and some white scales at the anterior margin.

== Etymology ==
The species name is refers to its similarity to Amblymelanoplia unidentata.
