= Amblymelanoplia swartbergensis =

Scientific classification
- Kingdom: Animalia
- Phylum: Arthropoda
- Class: Insecta
- Order: Coleoptera
- Suborder: Polyphaga
- Infraorder: Scarabaeiformia
- Family: Scarabaeidae
- Genus: Amblymelanoplia
- Species: A. swartbergensis

Binomial name
- Amblymelanoplia swartbergensis Dombrow, 2022

Species of beetle

Amblymelanoplia swartbergensis is a species of beetle of the family Scarabaeidae. It is found in South Africa (Western Cape). The habitat consists of South Swartberg Fynbos.

== Description ==
Adults reach a length of about 10.1 mm (0.40 in). They are mostly dull black. The clypeus and the head have black setae. The pronotum has brown setae, some white scales on the posterior margin and dark-brown setae on the lateral and anterior margins. The elytra have brown and black setae and some white scales at the anterior margin.

== Life history ==
The recorded host plant is Pteronia pallens.

== Etymology ==
The species name refers to the place of the capture, the Swartberg Mountains.
