= Amblymelanoplia bimucronata =

Scientific classification
- Kingdom: Animalia
- Phylum: Arthropoda
- Class: Insecta
- Order: Coleoptera
- Suborder: Polyphaga
- Infraorder: Scarabaeiformia
- Family: Scarabaeidae
- Genus: Amblymelanoplia
- Species: A. bimucronata

Binomial name
- Amblymelanoplia bimucronata Dombrow, 2022

Species of beetle

Amblymelanoplia bimucronata is a species of beetle of the family Scarabaeidae. It is found in South Africa (Western Cape). The habitat consists of Boland Granite Fynbos.

== Description ==
Adults reach a length of about 9.1 mm (0.36 in). They are mostly dull black, with the elytra and legs dark red brown. The clypeus has black setae, while the setae on the head are brown. The pronotum has brown setae, some white scales at the posterior margin and dark red-brown setae on the lateral and anterior margins. The elytra have pale-brown setae and some white scales at the anterior margin.

== Etymology ==
The species name is derived from Latin mucro (meaning sharp tip or point) and refers to the two apical mucrones of the metathoracic tibia.
