= Amblymelanoplia burchelli =

Scientific classification
- Kingdom: Animalia
- Phylum: Arthropoda
- Class: Insecta
- Order: Coleoptera
- Suborder: Polyphaga
- Infraorder: Scarabaeiformia
- Family: Scarabaeidae
- Genus: Amblymelanoplia
- Species: A. burchelli

Binomial name
- Amblymelanoplia burchelli (Arrow, 1917)

Synonyms
- Gouna burchelli Arrow, 1917

Species of beetle

Amblymelanoplia burchelli is a species of beetle of the family Scarabaeidae. It is found in South Africa (Western Cape). The habitat consists of Mossel Bay Shale Renosterveld.

== Description ==
Adults reach a length of about 8.5–8.6 mm. They are dull black. The head and clypeus have black setae, while the pronotum has short brown setae and short dark brown setae on the lateral and anterior margins. The elytra have short brown setae.
