= Amblymelanoplia stalsi =

Scientific classification
- Kingdom: Animalia
- Phylum: Arthropoda
- Class: Insecta
- Order: Coleoptera
- Suborder: Polyphaga
- Infraorder: Scarabaeiformia
- Family: Scarabaeidae
- Genus: Amblymelanoplia
- Species: A. stalsi

Binomial name
- Amblymelanoplia stalsi Dombrow, 2022

Species of beetle

Amblymelanoplia stalsi is a species of beetle of the family Scarabaeidae. It is found in South Africa (Western Cape). The habitat consists of South Langeberg Sandstone Fynbos.

== Description ==
Adults reach a length of about 12.1 mm (0.48 in). They are mostly dull black. The clypeus has black setae, while the setae on the head are brown. The pronotum has pale-brown and brown setae, a few white scales at the posterior margin and black setae on the anterior and lateral margins. The elytra have pale-brown and brown setae, as well as some white scales at the anterior margin.

== Etymology ==
The species is dedicated to Mr. Riaan Stals.
