= Charismatic megafauna =

Large animals with popular appeal

An African bush elephant (Loxodonta africana), is an example of charismatic megafauna.

Charismatic megafauna are animal species that are large—relative to the category that they represent—with symbolic value or widespread popular appeal. They are often used by environmental activists to gain public support for environmentalist goals. In this definition, animals such as penguins or bald eagles are megafauna because they are among the largest animals within the local animal community, and they disproportionately affect their environment. The vast majority of charismatic megafauna species are threatened and endangered by issues such as overhunting, poaching, black market trade, climate change, habitat destruction, and invasive species. In a 2018 study, the top twenty most charismatic megafauna (first to last) are the tiger, lion, elephant, giraffe, leopard, panda, cheetah, polar bear, wolf, gorilla, chimpanzee, zebra, hippopotamus, great white shark, crocodile, dolphin, rhinoceros, brown bear, koala, and blue whale.

== Use in conservation ==
Charismatic species are often used as flagship species in conservation programs, as they are supposed to affect people's feelings more. However, being charismatic does not protect species against extinction; all of the 10 most charismatic species are currently endangered, and only the giant panda shows a demographic growth from an extremely small population.

Beginning early in the 20th century, efforts to reintroduce extirpated charismatic megafauna to ecosystems have been an interest of a number of private and non-government conservation organizations. Species have been reintroduced from captive breeding programs in zoos, such as the wisent (the European bison) to Poland's Białowieża Forest. These and other reintroductions of charismatic megafauna, such as Przewalski's horse to Mongolia, have been to areas of limited, and often patchy, range compared to the historic ranges of the respective species.

Environmental activists and proponents of ecotourism seek to use the leverage provided by charismatic and well-known species to achieve more subtle and far-reaching goals in species and biodiversity conservation. By directing public attention to the diminishing numbers of giant panda due to habitat loss, for example, conservation groups can raise support for the protection of the panda and for the entire ecosystem of which it is a part.

== Taxonomic bias ==
Charismatic megafauna may be subject to taxonomic inflation, in that taxonomists will declare a subspecies to be a species because of the advocacy benefits of a unique species, rather than because of new scientific evidence. The public's preference to identify with species sold through the ecotourism industry may be a factor for creating taxonomic inflation. In the public perception, ecotourism may be about seeing species, and the number of unique species increases the perceived biodiversity and tourism value of an area. A correlation may exist between the taxonomic bias in biodiversity datasets and the charisma of terrestrial megafauna, with the more charismatic species being largely over-reported. However, reports that charismatic megafauna are more engaging to the public than other species have been questioned.

== See also ==
- Bambi effect
- Flagship species
