= Amblymelanoplia setosa =

Scientific classification
- Kingdom: Animalia
- Phylum: Arthropoda
- Class: Insecta
- Order: Coleoptera
- Suborder: Polyphaga
- Infraorder: Scarabaeiformia
- Family: Scarabaeidae
- Genus: Amblymelanoplia
- Species: A. setosa

Binomial name
- Amblymelanoplia setosa Dombrow, 2022

Species of beetle

Amblymelanoplia setosa is a species of beetle of the family Scarabaeidae. It is found in South Africa (Western Cape). The habitat consists of Swartland Alluvium Fynbos.

== Description ==
Adults reach a length of about 9.8 mm. The pronotum is dull black, while the abdomen is dark red-brown. The clypeus has brown setae, while these setae are dark-brown on the head. The pronotum and elytra have brown setae.

== Etymology ==
The species name is derived from Latin seta (meaning a bristle) and refers to the longer setae on the pronotum, elytra, thorax and abdomen.
