= Amblymelanoplia atritica =

Scientific classification
- Kingdom: Animalia
- Phylum: Arthropoda
- Class: Insecta
- Order: Coleoptera
- Suborder: Polyphaga
- Infraorder: Scarabaeiformia
- Family: Scarabaeidae
- Genus: Amblymelanoplia
- Species: A. atritica

Binomial name
- Amblymelanoplia atritica Dombrow, 2022

Species of beetle

Amblymelanoplia atritica is a species of beetle of the family Scarabaeidae. It is found in South Africa (Western Cape).

== Description ==
Adults reach a length of about 9.2 mm. They are dull black. The clypeus and head have black setae, while the pronotum has pale-brown setae and black setae of various lengths. The setae on the elytra are short and pale-brown.

== Etymology ==
The species name is derived from Latin atri (meaning black).
