= Amblymelanoplia crenata =

Scientific classification
- Kingdom: Animalia
- Phylum: Arthropoda
- Class: Insecta
- Order: Coleoptera
- Suborder: Polyphaga
- Infraorder: Scarabaeiformia
- Family: Scarabaeidae
- Genus: Amblymelanoplia
- Species: A. crenata

Binomial name
- Amblymelanoplia crenata Dombrow, 2022

Species of beetle

Amblymelanoplia crenata is a species of beetle of the family Scarabaeidae. It is found in South Africa (Western Cape).

== Description ==
Adults reach a length of about 8.9 mm. They are dull black, with dark red-brown legs. The clypeus and head have black setae, while the pronotum has pale brown and black setae. The elytra have pale-brown setae.

== Etymology ==
The species name is derived from Latin crena (meaning a notch) and refers to the distinctly incised anterior margin of the clypeus.
