= Amblymelanoplia fabricii =

Scientific classification
- Kingdom: Animalia
- Phylum: Arthropoda
- Class: Insecta
- Order: Coleoptera
- Suborder: Polyphaga
- Infraorder: Scarabaeiformia
- Family: Scarabaeidae
- Genus: Amblymelanoplia
- Species: A. fabricii

Binomial name
- Amblymelanoplia fabricii Dombrow, 2022

Species of beetle

Amblymelanoplia fabricii is a species of beetle of the family Scarabaeidae. It is found in South Africa (Western Cape). The habitat consists of Boland Granite Fynbos.

== Description ==
Adults reach a length of about 7.9 mm. They are mostly dull black, with the pygidium and legs dark red-brown. The clypeus and the head have black setae. The pronotum has pale-brown setae mixed with brown and dark-brown setae. The elytra have brown setae mixed with a few whitish scales.

== Etymology ==
The species is dedicated to the famous entomologist Johann Christian Fabricius.
