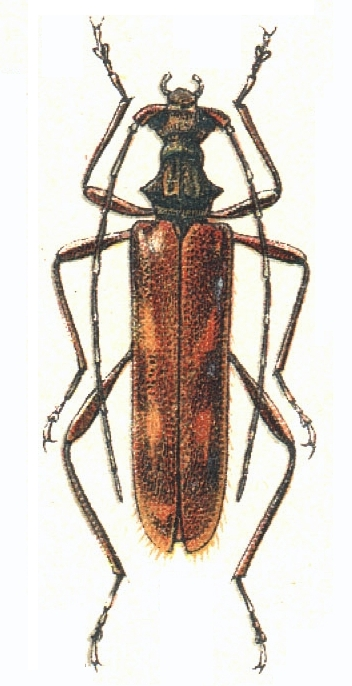
- Leptorhabdium caucasicum

Scientific classification
- Kingdom: Animalia
- Phylum: Arthropoda
- Class: Insecta
- Order: Coleoptera
- Suborder: Polyphaga
- Infraorder: Cucujiformia
- Family: Cerambycidae
- Tribe: Xylosteini
- Genus: Leptorhabdium
- Species: Leptorhabdium

Binomial name
- Leptorhabdium Kraatz, 1879

Synonyms
- Leptorrhabdium Ganglbauer, 1881; Leptorrhadium Ganglbauer, 1881; Psilorhabdium Kraatz, 1879

= Leptorhabdium =

Genus of beetles

Leptorhabdium is a genus of beetle in the family Cerambycidae. It contains the following species:

- Leptorhabdium caucasicum (Kraatz, 1879)
- Leptorhabdium illyricum (Kraatz, 1870)
- Leptorhabdium nitidum Holzschuh, 1974
- Leptorhabdium pictum (Haldeman, 1847)
