= Amblymelanoplia mortoni =

Scientific classification
- Kingdom: Animalia
- Phylum: Arthropoda
- Class: Insecta
- Order: Coleoptera
- Suborder: Polyphaga
- Infraorder: Scarabaeiformia
- Family: Scarabaeidae
- Genus: Amblymelanoplia
- Species: A. mortoni

Binomial name
- Amblymelanoplia mortoni Dombrow, 2022

Species of beetle

Amblymelanoplia mortoni is a species of beetle of the family Scarabaeidae. It is found in South Africa (Western Cape). The habitat consists of North Sonderend Sandstone Fynbos.

== Description ==
Adults reach a length of about 8.8 mm. They are mostly black. The clypeus and head have black setae, while the pronotum has black setae of various lengths, as well as brown setae on the lateral and anterior margins. The elytra have black setae mixed brown setae.

== Etymology ==
The species is dedicated to the South African lepidopterist Mr. Andrew Morton.
