= Amblymelanoplia frischi =

Scientific classification
- Kingdom: Animalia
- Phylum: Arthropoda
- Class: Insecta
- Order: Coleoptera
- Suborder: Polyphaga
- Infraorder: Scarabaeiformia
- Family: Scarabaeidae
- Genus: Amblymelanoplia
- Species: A. frischi

Binomial name
- Amblymelanoplia frischi Dombrow, 2022

Species of beetle

Amblymelanoplia frischi is a species of beetle of the family Scarabaeidae. It is found in South Africa (Western Cape).

== Description ==
Adults reach a length of about 10.9 mm. They are mostly dull black. The clypeus and the head have black setae, while the pronotum has brown setae of various lengths. The elytra have brown setae and a few white scales.

== Etymology ==
The species is dedicated to Dr. Johannes Frisch, the curator of the Coleoptera Department of the Natural History Museum, Berlin.
