= Amblymelanoplia pseudostrigata =

Scientific classification
- Kingdom: Animalia
- Phylum: Arthropoda
- Class: Insecta
- Order: Coleoptera
- Suborder: Polyphaga
- Infraorder: Scarabaeiformia
- Family: Scarabaeidae
- Genus: Amblymelanoplia
- Species: A. pseudostrigata

Binomial name
- Amblymelanoplia pseudostrigata Dombrow, 2022

Species of beetle

Amblymelanoplia pseudostrigata is a species of beetle of the family Scarabaeidae. It is found in South Africa (Western Cape).

== Description ==
Adults reach a length of about 10.5 mm (0.41 in). They are mostly dull black, with the elytra and legs dark red-brown. The clypeus and the head have brown setae. The pronotum has brown setae and some white scales at the posterior margin. The elytra have brown setae and some white scales along the anterior margin.

== Etymology ==
The species name refers to the medial pseudo-furrow on the pronotum produced by a lower density of punctuation.
