= Amblymelanoplia balkei =

Scientific classification
- Kingdom: Animalia
- Phylum: Arthropoda
- Class: Insecta
- Order: Coleoptera
- Suborder: Polyphaga
- Infraorder: Scarabaeiformia
- Family: Scarabaeidae
- Genus: Amblymelanoplia
- Species: A. balkei

Binomial name
- Amblymelanoplia balkei Dombrow, 2022

Species of beetle

Amblymelanoplia balkei is a species of beetle of the family Scarabaeidae. It is found in South Africa (Western Cape).

== Description ==
Adults reach a length of about 9.2–10 mm. They are dark red-brown, with the head, pronotum and scutellum dull black. The clypeus and head have black setae, while the pronotum has pale-brown and brown setae of various lengths. The setae on the elytra short and pale-brown.

== Etymology ==
The species is dedicated to Dr. Michael Balke, the chief curator of the Coleoptera department of the Zoological State Collection of the Bavarian State.
