= Amblymelanoplia pygidialis =

Scientific classification
- Kingdom: Animalia
- Phylum: Arthropoda
- Class: Insecta
- Order: Coleoptera
- Suborder: Polyphaga
- Infraorder: Scarabaeiformia
- Family: Scarabaeidae
- Genus: Amblymelanoplia
- Species: A. pygidialis

Binomial name
- Amblymelanoplia pygidialis Dombrow, 2022

Species of beetle

Amblymelanoplia pygidialis is a species of beetle of the family Scarabaeidae. It is found in South Africa (Western Cape).

== Description ==
Adults reach a length of about 11.2 mm (0.44 in). They are mostly dull black. The clypeus and head have black setae. The pronotum has brown setae, as well as dark-brown setae on the lateral and anterior margins. The elytra have brown setae.

== Etymology ==
The species name is derived from Latin pygis (meaning rump) and refers to the pear-shaped pygidium.
