= Amblymelanoplia pulleiacea =

Scientific classification
- Kingdom: Animalia
- Phylum: Arthropoda
- Class: Insecta
- Order: Coleoptera
- Suborder: Polyphaga
- Infraorder: Scarabaeiformia
- Family: Scarabaeidae
- Genus: Amblymelanoplia
- Species: A. pulleiacea

Binomial name
- Amblymelanoplia pulleiacea Dombrow, 2022

Species of beetle

Amblymelanoplia pulleiacea is a species of beetle of the family Scarabaeidae. It is found in South Africa (Western Cape). The habitat consists of North Sonderend Sandstone Fynbos.

== Description ==
Adults reach a length of about 8.8 mm. They are mostly black. The clypeus and head have black setae, while the pronotum has brown setae, as well as black setae on the lateral and anterior margins. The elytra have black setae of various lengths.

== Etymology ==
The species name is derived from Latin pulleiacea (meaning black) and refers to the black colour of the beetle.
