= Amblymelanoplia rustenvredensis =

Scientific classification
- Kingdom: Animalia
- Phylum: Arthropoda
- Class: Insecta
- Order: Coleoptera
- Suborder: Polyphaga
- Infraorder: Scarabaeiformia
- Family: Scarabaeidae
- Genus: Amblymelanoplia
- Species: A. rustenvredensis

Binomial name
- Amblymelanoplia rustenvredensis Dombrow, 2002

Species of beetle

Amblymelanoplia rustenvredensis is a species of beetle of the family Scarabaeidae. It is found in South Africa (Western Cape). The habitat consists of South Swartberg Fynbos.

== Description ==
Adults reach a length of about 9.4–11.1 mm (0.37–0.44 in). They are mostly dull black. The clypeus and the head have black setae. The pronotum has brown setae, a band of white scales at the posterior margin and dark-brown setae on the lateral and anterior margins. The elytra have black setae and a band of white scales at the anterior margin.
