= Amblymelanoplia robertsi =

Scientific classification
- Kingdom: Animalia
- Phylum: Arthropoda
- Class: Insecta
- Order: Coleoptera
- Suborder: Polyphaga
- Infraorder: Scarabaeiformia
- Family: Scarabaeidae
- Genus: Amblymelanoplia
- Species: A. robertsi

Binomial name
- Amblymelanoplia robertsi Dombrow, 2022

Species of beetle

Amblymelanoplia robertsi is a species of beetle of the family Scarabaeidae. It is found in South Africa (Western Cape). The habitat consists of Klawer Sandy Shrubland.

== Description ==
Adults reach a length of about 11 mm. They are mostly dull black, with the legs blackish red-brown. The clypeus and head have black setae, while the pronotum has pale-brown and brown setae, as well as dark-brown setae on the lateral and anterior margins. The elytra have pale-brown setae, mixed with single white scales, as well as brown setae.

== Etymology ==
The species is dedicated to the collector of the species, Mr A. Roberts.
