= Amblymelanoplia brancuccii =

Scientific classification
- Kingdom: Animalia
- Phylum: Arthropoda
- Class: Insecta
- Order: Coleoptera
- Suborder: Polyphaga
- Infraorder: Scarabaeiformia
- Family: Scarabaeidae
- Genus: Amblymelanoplia
- Species: A. brancuccii

Binomial name
- Amblymelanoplia brancuccii Dombrow, 2022

Species of beetle

Amblymelanoplia brancuccii is a species of beetle of the family Scarabaeidae. It is found in South Africa (Western Cape). The habitat consists of Klawer Sandy Shrubland.

== Description ==
Adults reach a length of about 10 mm. They are mostly dull black, with dark red-brown legs. The clypeus and the head have black setae. The pronotum has brown setae of various lengths and dark-brown setae on the lateral and anterior margins. The elytra have short, pale-brown setae and white scales.

== Etymology ==
The species is dedicated to Dr Michele Brancucci, former curator of the Entomological Department and vice director of the Natural History Museum Basel.
