= Amblymelanoplia scheini =

Scientific classification
- Kingdom: Animalia
- Phylum: Arthropoda
- Class: Insecta
- Order: Coleoptera
- Suborder: Polyphaga
- Infraorder: Scarabaeiformia
- Family: Scarabaeidae
- Genus: Amblymelanoplia
- Species: A. scheini

Binomial name
- Amblymelanoplia scheini Dombrow, 2022

Species of beetle

Amblymelanoplia scheini is a species of beetle of the family Scarabaeidae. It is found in South Africa (Western Cape).

== Description ==
Adults reach a length of about 10.6 mm (0.42 in). They are mostly dull black, while the elytra are blackish red-brown. The clypeus and head have black setae. The pronotum has brown setae and some white scales at the posterior margin. The elytra have brown setae.

== Etymology ==
The species is dedicated to the German entomologist Hans Schein.
