= Amblymelanoplia zuercherae =

Scientific classification
- Kingdom: Animalia
- Phylum: Arthropoda
- Class: Insecta
- Order: Coleoptera
- Suborder: Polyphaga
- Infraorder: Scarabaeiformia
- Family: Scarabaeidae
- Genus: Amblymelanoplia
- Species: A. zuercherae

Binomial name
- Amblymelanoplia zuercherae Dombrow, 2022

Species of beetle

Amblymelanoplia zuercherae is a species of beetle of the family Scarabaeidae. It is found in South Africa (Western Cape). The habitat consists of Boland Granite Fynbos.

== Description ==
Adults reach a length of about 9.6 mm (0.38 in). They are dull black, with the legs are dark-brown. The clypeus and head have black setae setae. The pronotum has pale-brown setae and brown setae, as well as dark-brown setae on the lateral and anterior margins. The elytra have brown setae and whitish scales.

== Etymology ==
The species is dedicated to Mrs. Isabelle Zürcher-Pfander, collection manager at the Bioscience Department of the Natural History Museum Basel.
