= Amblymelanoplia mcleodi =

Scientific classification
- Kingdom: Animalia
- Phylum: Arthropoda
- Class: Insecta
- Order: Coleoptera
- Suborder: Polyphaga
- Infraorder: Scarabaeiformia
- Family: Scarabaeidae
- Genus: Amblymelanoplia
- Species: A. mcleodi

Binomial name
- Amblymelanoplia mcleodi Dombrow, 2022

Species of beetle

Amblymelanoplia mcleodi is a species of beetle of the family Scarabaeidae. It is found in South Africa (Western Cape). The habitat consists of Piketberg Sandstone Fynbos.

== Description ==
Adults reach a length of about 10.4–12.5 mm (0.41–0.49 in) (males) and 11–12.7 mm (0.43–0.50 in) (females). Males are mostly dull black, while the females are brown with the head and clypeus black and the pronotum, scutellum and elytra sometimes black. In males, the clypeus and head have black setae, while these are yellowish-orange in females. The pronotum of the males has brown setae, some white scales at the posterior margin and black setae on the lateral and anterior margins. In females, the pronotum has yellowish-orange and some white scales, as well as brown setae on the anterior and lateral margins. The male elytra have brown and black setae, as well as some white scales at the anterior margin. The elytra of the females have yellowish-orange scales, pale-brown setae, and sometimes white scales.

== Life history ==
The recorded host plant is Athanasia pubescens, and the adults have been observed feeding on the sap.

== Etymology ==
The species is dedicated to Dr. Len McLeod, the collector of the species.
