= Amblymelanoplia constricta =

Scientific classification
- Kingdom: Animalia
- Phylum: Arthropoda
- Class: Insecta
- Order: Coleoptera
- Suborder: Polyphaga
- Infraorder: Scarabaeiformia
- Family: Scarabaeidae
- Genus: Amblymelanoplia
- Species: A. constricta

Binomial name
- Amblymelanoplia constricta Dombrow, 2022

Species of beetle

Amblymelanoplia constricta is a species of beetle of the family Scarabaeidae. It is found in South Africa (Western Cape).

== Description ==
Adults reach a length of about 8.1 mm. They are dull black. The clypeus and head have brown setae, while the pronotum has brown and black setae. The elytra have short, pale-brown setae.

== Etymology ==
The species name is derived from Latin constricta (meaning shortened) and refers to the shortened medial furrow on the pronotum.
