= Amblymelanoplia capensis =

Scientific classification
- Kingdom: Animalia
- Phylum: Arthropoda
- Class: Insecta
- Order: Coleoptera
- Suborder: Polyphaga
- Infraorder: Scarabaeiformia
- Family: Scarabaeidae
- Genus: Amblymelanoplia
- Species: A. capensis

Binomial name
- Amblymelanoplia capensis Dombrow, 2002

Species of beetle

Amblymelanoplia capensis is a species of beetle of the family Scarabaeidae. It is found in South Africa (Western Cape). The habitat consists of Cape Flats Sand Fynbos.

== Description ==
Adults reach a length of about 10.6 mm (0.42 in). They are mostly dull black. The clypeus and the head have black setae. The pronotum has pale-brown setae, some white scales at the posterior margin and black setae on the lateral and anterior margins. The elytra have pale-brown and brown setae and some white scales at the anterior margin.
