= Amblymelanoplia zumpti =

Scientific classification
- Kingdom: Animalia
- Phylum: Arthropoda
- Class: Insecta
- Order: Coleoptera
- Suborder: Polyphaga
- Infraorder: Scarabaeiformia
- Family: Scarabaeidae
- Genus: Amblymelanoplia
- Species: A. zumpti

Binomial name
- Amblymelanoplia zumpti Dombrow, 2022

Species of beetle

Amblymelanoplia zumpti is a species of beetle of the family Scarabaeidae. It is found in South Africa (Western Cape). The habitat consists of Peninsula Sandstone Fynbos.

== Description ==
Adults reach a length of about 8.9–9.1 mm. They are dull black, with the abdomen and legs dark-brown. The clypeus and head have black setae, while the pronotum has brown setae and black setae on the lateral and anterior margins. The elytra have brown setae.

== Etymology ==
The species is dedicated to the German-South African entomologist Dr. Fritz Konrad Ernst Zumpt.
