= Amblymelanoplia scutellaris =

Scientific classification
- Kingdom: Animalia
- Phylum: Arthropoda
- Class: Insecta
- Order: Coleoptera
- Suborder: Polyphaga
- Infraorder: Scarabaeiformia
- Family: Scarabaeidae
- Genus: Amblymelanoplia
- Species: A. scutellaris

Binomial name
- Amblymelanoplia scutellaris Dombrow, 2022

Species of beetle

Amblymelanoplia scutellaris is a species of beetle of the family Scarabaeidae. It is found in South Africa (Western Cape). The habitat consists of North Sonderend Sandstone Fynbos.

== Description ==
Adults reach a length of about 8.9 mm. They are mostly lustrous black. The clypeus and head have black setae, while the pronotum has black setae. The elytra have black setae of various lengths.

== Etymology ==
The species name is derived from Latin scutellum (meaning a little shield) and refers to the shape of the scutellum.
