= Amblymelanoplia worcesterensis =

Scientific classification
- Kingdom: Animalia
- Phylum: Arthropoda
- Class: Insecta
- Order: Coleoptera
- Suborder: Polyphaga
- Infraorder: Scarabaeiformia
- Family: Scarabaeidae
- Genus: Amblymelanoplia
- Species: A. worcesterensis

Binomial name
- Amblymelanoplia worcesterensis Dombrow, 2022

Species of beetle

Amblymelanoplia worcesterensis is a species of beetle of the family Scarabaeidae. It is found in South Africa (Western Cape). The habitat consists of Robertson Karoo.

== Description ==
Adults reach a length of about 10.2 mm. They are mostly dull black, with the elytra blackish red-brown and all the legs dark red-brown. The clypeus and head have brown setae, while the pronotum has pale-brown setae, mixed with a brown setae. There are black setae on the anterior and lateral margins. The elytra have pale-brown setae mixed with brown setae.

== Etymology ==
The species name refers to the locality of capture, the town of Worcester in the south-west of the Western Cape Province.
