= Leptorhabdium nitidum =

Scientific classification
- Kingdom: Animalia
- Phylum: Arthropoda
- Class: Insecta
- Order: Coleoptera
- Suborder: Polyphaga
- Infraorder: Cucujiformia
- Family: Cerambycidae
- Genus: Leptorhabdium
- Species: L. nitidum

Binomial name
- Leptorhabdium nitidum Holzschuh, 1974

Species of beetle

Leptorhabdium nitidum is the species of the Lepturinae subfamily in the long-horned beetle family. This beetle is distributed in Greece, and North Macedonia.
