= Amblymelanoplia arrowi =

Scientific classification
- Kingdom: Animalia
- Phylum: Arthropoda
- Class: Insecta
- Order: Coleoptera
- Suborder: Polyphaga
- Infraorder: Scarabaeiformia
- Family: Scarabaeidae
- Genus: Amblymelanoplia
- Species: A. arrowi

Binomial name
- Amblymelanoplia arrowi Dombrow, 2022

Species of beetle

Amblymelanoplia arrowi is a species of beetle of the family Scarabaeidae. It is found in South Africa (Western Cape).

== Description ==
Adults reach a length of about 9.1 mm. They are blackish red-brown, with the head and pronotum black. The clypeus and head have brown setae, while those on the pronotum are mixed pale-brown setae and brown and of various lengths and thickness. The setae on the elytra short and brown.

== Etymology ==
The species is dedicated to the entomologist Gilbert John Arrow.
