= Amblymelanoplia gifbergensis =

Scientific classification
- Kingdom: Animalia
- Phylum: Arthropoda
- Class: Insecta
- Order: Coleoptera
- Suborder: Polyphaga
- Infraorder: Scarabaeiformia
- Family: Scarabaeidae
- Genus: Amblymelanoplia
- Species: A. gifbergensis

Binomial name
- Amblymelanoplia gifbergensis Dombrow, 2022

Species of beetle

Amblymelanoplia gifbergensis is a species of beetle of the family Scarabaeidae. It is found in South Africa (Western Cape). The habitat consists of Bokkeveld Sandstone Fynbos.

== Description ==
Adults reach a length of about 11.1 mm. They are mostly dull black. The clypeus and the head have brown setae, while the pronotum has brown and dark-brown setae. The elytra have brown setae, mixed with white scales.

== Life history ==
The recorded host plant is Didelta spinosa.

== Etymology ==
The species name refers to the place of capture, the Gifberg Mountain near the town of Vanrhynsdorp.
