= Amblymelanoplia albolineata =

Scientific classification
- Kingdom: Animalia
- Phylum: Arthropoda
- Class: Insecta
- Order: Coleoptera
- Suborder: Polyphaga
- Infraorder: Scarabaeiformia
- Family: Scarabaeidae
- Genus: Amblymelanoplia
- Species: A. albolineata

Binomial name
- Amblymelanoplia albolineata Dombrow, 2022

Species of beetle

Amblymelanoplia albolineata is a species of beetle of the family Scarabaeidae. It is found in South Africa (Western Cape). The habitat consists of South Langeberg Sandstone Fynbos.

== Description ==
Adults reach a length of about 12.5 mm (0.49 in). They are mostly dull black. The clypeus and the head have black setae. The pronotum has pale-brown setae, as well as some white scales at the posterior margin and red-brown setae on the lateral and anterior margins. The elytra have pale-brown and brown setae and some white scales at the anterior margin.

== Etymology ==
The species name is derived from albo (meaning white) and linea (meaning strip) and refers to the white squamose stripes of the ventrites.
