= Amblymelanoplia citrusdalensis =

Scientific classification
- Kingdom: Animalia
- Phylum: Arthropoda
- Class: Insecta
- Order: Coleoptera
- Suborder: Polyphaga
- Infraorder: Scarabaeiformia
- Family: Scarabaeidae
- Genus: Amblymelanoplia
- Species: A. citrusdalensis

Binomial name
- Amblymelanoplia citrusdalensis Dombrow, 2022

Species of beetle

Amblymelanoplia citrusdalensis is a species of beetle of the family Scarabaeidae. It is found in South Africa (Western Cape). The habitat consists of Olifants Sandstone Fynbos.

== Description ==
Adults reach a length of about 10.4 mm. They are mostly dull black. The clypeus and head have black setae, while the pronotum has brown setae of various lengths. The elytra have short brown setae.

== Etymology ==
The species name refers to the place of capture near the town of Citrusdal in the Cederberg Mountains.
