= Amblymelanoplia turneri =

Scientific classification
- Kingdom: Animalia
- Phylum: Arthropoda
- Class: Insecta
- Order: Coleoptera
- Suborder: Polyphaga
- Infraorder: Scarabaeiformia
- Family: Scarabaeidae
- Genus: Amblymelanoplia
- Species: A. turneri

Binomial name
- Amblymelanoplia turneri Dombrow, 2022

Species of beetle

Amblymelanoplia turneri is a species of beetle of the family Scarabaeidae. It is found in South Africa (Western Cape). The habitat consists of Robertson Karoo.

== Description ==
Adults reach a length of about 10.3 mm. They are mostly dull black, with the elytra blackish red-brown. The clypeus and the head have black setae. The pronotum has pale-brown setae, as well as with a few white scales and black setae on the anterior and lateral margins. The elytra have pale-brown setae mixed with brown setae.

== Etymology ==
The species is dedicated to the Australian and South African entomologist Mr. Rowland Edwards Turner.
