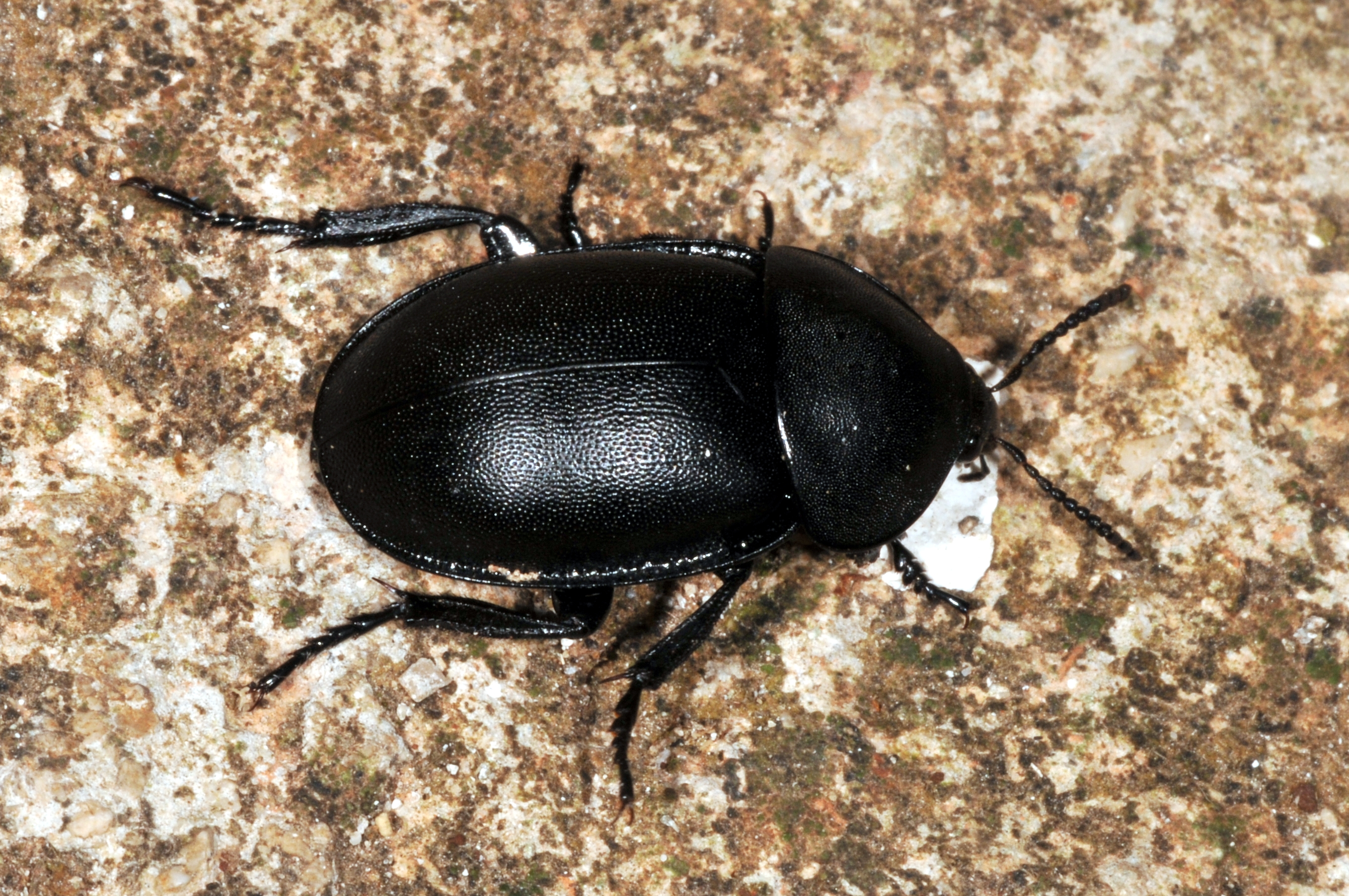

Scientific classification
- Kingdom: Animalia
- Phylum: Arthropoda
- Clade: Pancrustacea
- Class: Insecta
- Order: Coleoptera
- Suborder: Polyphaga
- Infraorder: Staphyliniformia
- Family: Staphylinidae
- Genus: Ablattaria
- Species: A. laevigata

Binomial name
- Ablattaria laevigata (Fabricius, 1775)

Synonyms
- Ablattaria costulata Portevin, 1926; Ablattaria distinguenda Portevin, 1926; Ablattaria meridionalis Ganglbauer, 1899; Ablattaria punctata Portevin, 1926; Silpha gibba Brullé, 1832; Silpha polita Sulzer, 1776

= Ablattaria laevigata =

Species of beetle

Ablattaria laevigata is a species of burying beetle or carrion beetle belonging to the family Silphidae.

== Description ==
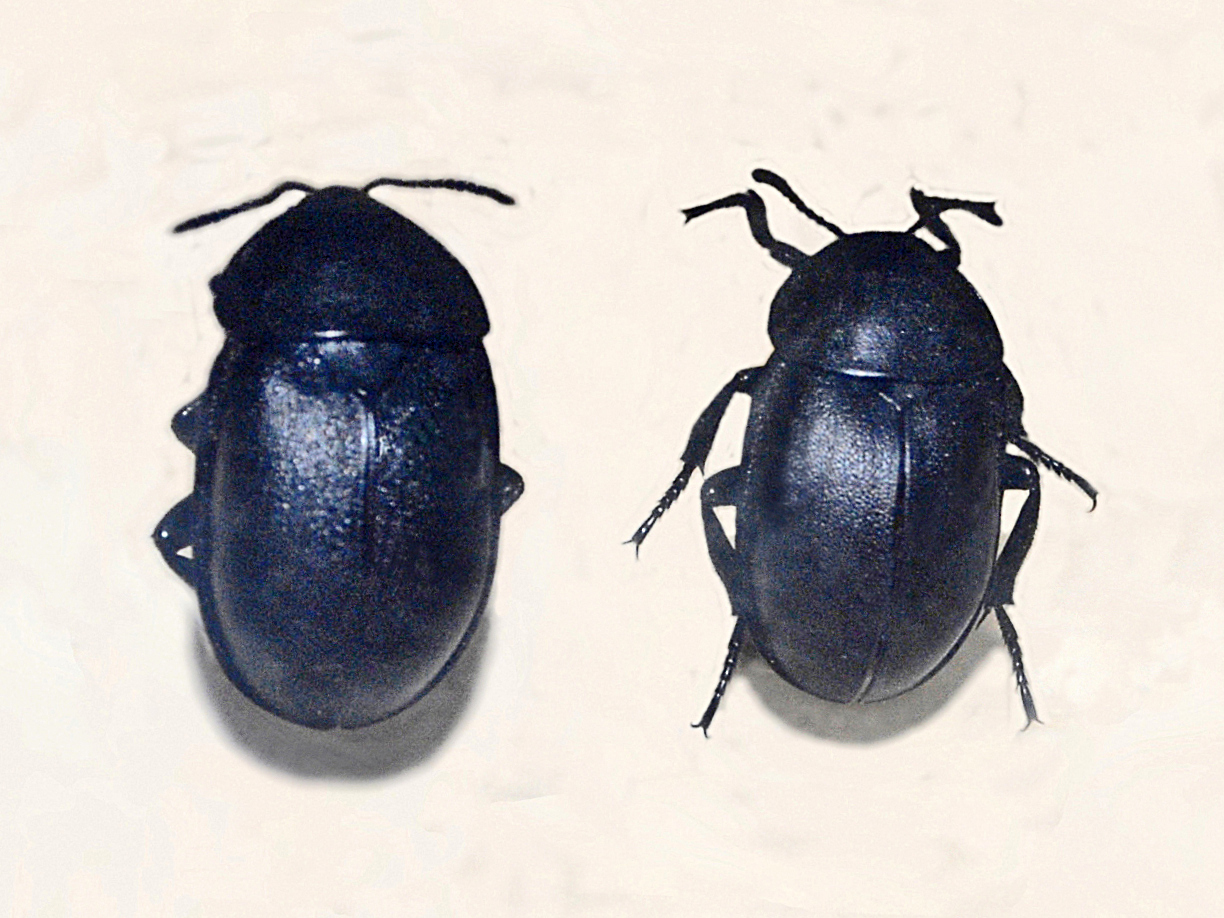
Ablattaria laevigata. Museum specimen

Ablattaria laevigata can reach a length of about 12–18 millimetres (0.47–0.71 in).

It has a semielliptical pronotum, which is not narrowed. Elytral punctuation is dense, with sparse thicker punctures.

These beetles are predators of terrestrial snails (Theba pisana, Monacha species, Xeropicta species, and Candidula species). They are able to penetrate the snail shells.

== Distribution ==
This species is present in most of Europe and in the Near East.
