= Amblymelanoplia lichtensteini =

Scientific classification
- Kingdom: Animalia
- Phylum: Arthropoda
- Class: Insecta
- Order: Coleoptera
- Suborder: Polyphaga
- Infraorder: Scarabaeiformia
- Family: Scarabaeidae
- Genus: Amblymelanoplia
- Species: A. lichtensteini

Binomial name
- Amblymelanoplia lichtensteini Dombrow, 2022

Species of beetle

Amblymelanoplia lichtensteini is a species of beetle of the family Scarabaeidae. It is found in South Africa (Western Cape).

== Description ==
Adults reach a length of about 9.1 mm (0.36 in). They are mostly dark red-brown, with the head, clypeus and pronotum black. The clypeus and the head have brown setae. The pronotum and the elytra have brown setae.

== Etymology ==
The species is dedicated to Martin Hinrich Lichtenstein, the founder of the Zoological Museum in Berlin.
