= Amblymelanoplia carinata =

Scientific classification
- Kingdom: Animalia
- Phylum: Arthropoda
- Class: Insecta
- Order: Coleoptera
- Suborder: Polyphaga
- Infraorder: Scarabaeiformia
- Family: Scarabaeidae
- Genus: Amblymelanoplia
- Species: A. carinata

Binomial name
- Amblymelanoplia carinata Dombrow, 2022

Species of beetle

Amblymelanoplia carinata is a species of beetle of the family Scarabaeidae. It is found in South Africa (Western Cape). The habitat consists of Breede Alluvium Fynbos.

== Description ==
Adults reach a length of about 10.9 mm. They are mostly dull black. The clypeus and the head have black setae. The pronotum has black setae of various lengths and the elytra have dark-brown setae.

== Etymology ==
The species name is derived from Latin carina (meaning keel) and refers to the distinct dorsal carina of the metathoracic tibia.
