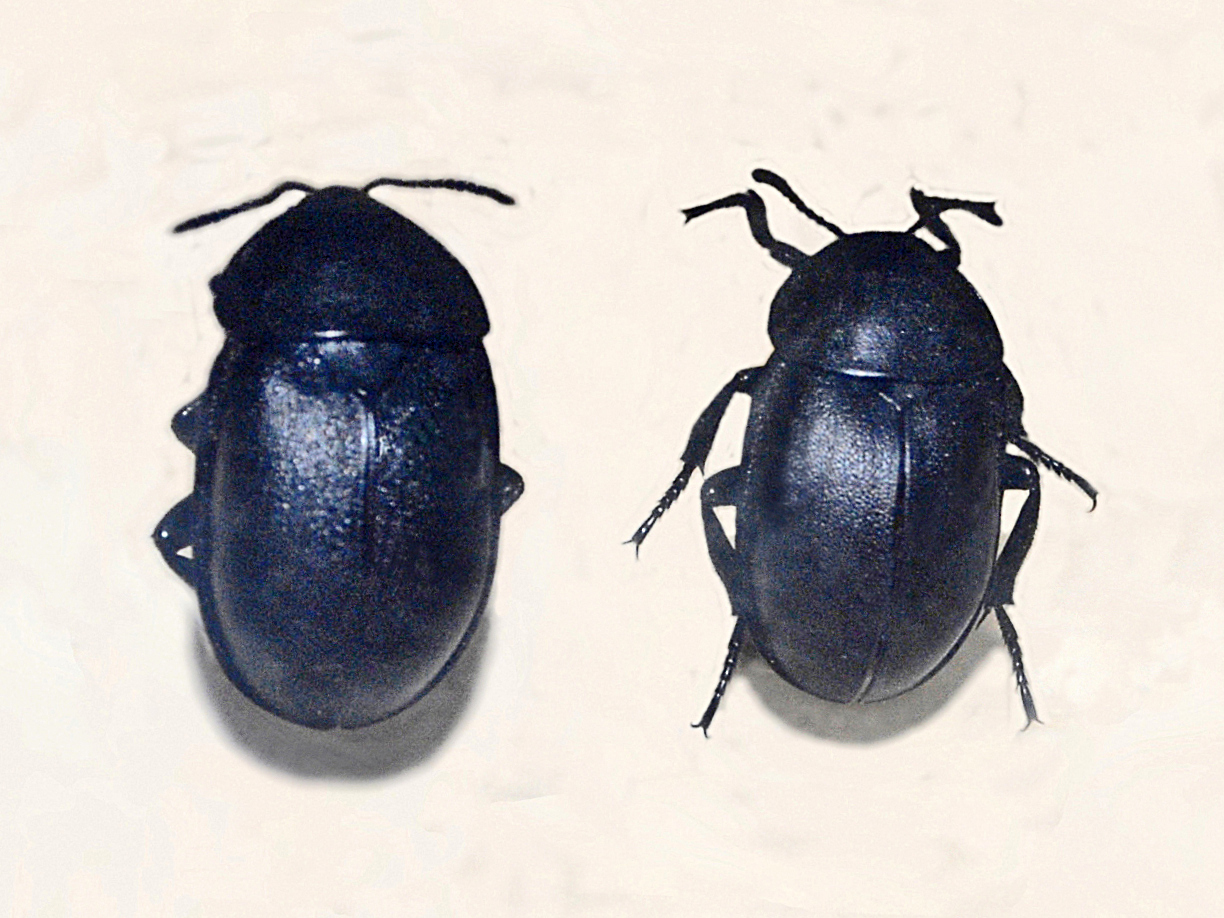
- Ablattaria laevigata

Scientific classification
- Kingdom: Animalia
- Phylum: Arthropoda
- Clade: Pancrustacea
- Class: Insecta
- Order: Coleoptera
- Suborder: Polyphaga
- Infraorder: Staphyliniformia
- Family: Staphylinidae
- Tribe: Silphini
- Genus: Ablattaria; Reitter, 1885

= Ablattaria =

Genus of beetles

Ablattaria is a genus of carrion beetles belonging to the family Silphidae. The beetles are predators of gastropods. All species in the genus exhibit sexual dimorphism.

== Species ==
- Ablattaria arenaria (Kraatz, 1876)
- Ablattaria cribrata (Ménétries, 1832)
- Ablattaria laevigata (Fabricius, 1775)
- Ablattaria subtriangula Reitter, 1905
