= Leptorhabdium pictum =

Scientific classification
- Kingdom: Animalia
- Phylum: Arthropoda
- Class: Insecta
- Order: Coleoptera
- Suborder: Polyphaga
- Infraorder: Cucujiformia
- Family: Cerambycidae
- Genus: Leptorhabdium
- Species: L. pictum

Binomial name
- Leptorhabdium pictum (Haldeman, 1847)

Synonyms
- Centrodera picta Leconte, 1850; Toxotus pictus Haldeman, 1847

Species of beetle

Leptorhabdium pictum is the species of the Lepturinae subfamily in the long-horned beetle family. This beetle is distributed in United States.
