= Amblymelanoplia bicostata =

Scientific classification
- Kingdom: Animalia
- Phylum: Arthropoda
- Class: Insecta
- Order: Coleoptera
- Suborder: Polyphaga
- Infraorder: Scarabaeiformia
- Family: Scarabaeidae
- Genus: Amblymelanoplia
- Species: A. bicostata

Binomial name
- Amblymelanoplia bicostata Dombrow, 2022

Species of beetle

Amblymelanoplia bicostata is a species of beetle of the family Scarabaeidae. It is found in South Africa (Western Cape).

== Description ==
Adults reach a length of about 9.2 mm. They are dull black, with the antennae dark red-brown. The clypeus has short pale-brown setae, while the setae on the head are short and black. The pronotum has short brown setae and black setae of various lengths. The elytra have short, pale-brown setae.

== Etymology ==
The species name is derived from Latin costa (meaning a rib) and refers to the two costae on the elytra.
