= Amblymelanoplia =

Scientific classification
- Kingdom: Animalia
- Phylum: Arthropoda
- Class: Insecta
- Order: Coleoptera
- Suborder: Polyphaga
- Infraorder: Scarabaeiformia
- Family: Scarabaeidae
- Subfamily: Melolonthinae
- Tribe: Hopliini
- Genus: Amblymelanoplia; Dombrow, 2002

Genus of leaf beetles

Amblymelanoplia is a genus of beetles belonging to the family Scarabaeidae.

== Species ==
- Amblymelanoplia aequabilis Dombrow, 2022
- Amblymelanoplia albolineata Dombrow, 2022
- Amblymelanoplia albosquamosa Dombrow, 2022
- Amblymelanoplia alluaudi Dombrow, 2022
- Amblymelanoplia aquifolia Dombrow, 2022
- Amblymelanoplia arrowi Dombrow, 2022
- Amblymelanoplia atritica Dombrow, 2022
- Amblymelanoplia baehri Dombrow, 2022
- Amblymelanoplia balkei Dombrow, 2022
- Amblymelanoplia bicostata Dombrow, 2022
- Amblymelanoplia bidentata Dombrow, 2022
- Amblymelanoplia bimucronata Dombrow, 2022
- Amblymelanoplia brancuccii Dombrow, 2022
- Amblymelanoplia braunsi Dombrow, 2022
- Amblymelanoplia brinckmanni Dombrow, 2022
- Amblymelanoplia burchelli (Arrow, 1917)
- Amblymelanoplia burmeisteri Dombrow, 2022
- Amblymelanoplia caliginosa Dombrow, 2022
- Amblymelanoplia capensis Dombrow, 2002
- Amblymelanoplia carinata Dombrow, 2022
- Amblymelanoplia castanea Dombrow, 2022
- Amblymelanoplia cavitibialis Dombrow, 2002
- Amblymelanoplia cederbergensis Dombrow, 2022
- Amblymelanoplia citrusdalensis Dombrow, 2022
- Amblymelanoplia constricta Dombrow, 2022
- Amblymelanoplia cornuta Dombrow, 2002
- Amblymelanoplia costata Dombrow, 2022
- Amblymelanoplia crenata Dombrow, 2022
- Amblymelanoplia deyrollei Dombrow, 2022
- Amblymelanoplia dregei Dombrow, 2022
- Amblymelanoplia drumonti Dombrow, 2022
- Amblymelanoplia elkeae Dombrow, 2022
- Amblymelanoplia enodisuturalis Dombrow, 2022
- Amblymelanoplia fabricii Dombrow, 2022
- Amblymelanoplia felschei Dombrow, 2022
- Amblymelanoplia frischi Dombrow, 2022
- Amblymelanoplia fryi Dombrow, 2022
- Amblymelanoplia fusca Dombrow, 2022
- Amblymelanoplia gifbergensis Dombrow, 2022
- Amblymelanoplia glenlyonensis Dombrow, 2022
- Amblymelanoplia goodhopensis Dombrow, 2022
- Amblymelanoplia gydoensis Dombrow, 2022
- Amblymelanoplia jekeli Dombrow, 2022
- Amblymelanoplia klassi Dombrow, 2022
- Amblymelanoplia kraatzi Dombrow, 2022
- Amblymelanoplia kulzeri Dombrow, 2022
- Amblymelanoplia lainsburgensis Dombrow, 2022
- Amblymelanoplia lajoyei Dombrow, 2022
- Amblymelanoplia lichtensteini Dombrow, 2022
- Amblymelanoplia macrodentata Dombrow, 2022
- Amblymelanoplia mamreensis Dombrow, 2022
- Amblymelanoplia mcleodi Dombrow, 2022
- Amblymelanoplia microdentata Dombrow, 2022
- Amblymelanoplia montana Dombrow, 2022
- Amblymelanoplia mortoni Dombrow, 2022
- Amblymelanoplia multidentata Dombrow, 2022
- Amblymelanoplia murrayi Dombrow, 2022
- Amblymelanoplia nigra Dombrow, 2022
- Amblymelanoplia obscura Dombrow, 2022
- Amblymelanoplia paraunidentata Dombrow, 2022
- Amblymelanoplia pascoei Dombrow, 2022
- Amblymelanoplia pentheri Dombrow, 2022
- Amblymelanoplia pseudocostata Dombrow, 2022
- Amblymelanoplia pseudostrigata Dombrow, 2022
- Amblymelanoplia pseudounidentata Dombrow, 2022
- Amblymelanoplia pulchra Dombrow, 2022
- Amblymelanoplia pulleiacea Dombrow, 2022
- Amblymelanoplia punctata Dombrow, 2022
- Amblymelanoplia pygidialis Dombrow, 2022
- Amblymelanoplia reichei Dombrow, 2022
- Amblymelanoplia robertsi Dombrow, 2022
- Amblymelanoplia rustenvredensis Dombrow, 2002
- Amblymelanoplia sainvali Dombrow, 2022
- Amblymelanoplia scheini Dombrow, 2022
- Amblymelanoplia scutellaris Dombrow, 2022
- Amblymelanoplia selbi Dombrow, 2022
- Amblymelanoplia septentrionalestris Dombrow, 2022
- Amblymelanoplia setosa Dombrow, 2022
- Amblymelanoplia soetwaterensis Dombrow, 2022
- Amblymelanoplia spinipes (Fabricius, 1781)
- Amblymelanoplia sprecherae Dombrow, 2022
- Amblymelanoplia squamosa Dombrow, 2022
- Amblymelanoplia stalsi Dombrow, 2022
- Amblymelanoplia stellenboschensis Dombrow, 2022
- Amblymelanoplia strigata Dombrow, 2022
- Amblymelanoplia sulcata Dombrow, 2022
- Amblymelanoplia swartbergensis Dombrow, 2022
- Amblymelanoplia swellendamensis Dombrow, 2022
- Amblymelanoplia thomsoni Dombrow, 2022
- Amblymelanoplia tradouwensis Dombrow, 2022
- Amblymelanoplia tuberculata Dombrow, 2022
- Amblymelanoplia turneri Dombrow, 2022
- Amblymelanoplia unidentata Dombrow, 2022
- Amblymelanoplia vansoni Dombrow, 2022
- Amblymelanoplia webbi Dombrow, 2022
- Amblymelanoplia wittmeri Dombrow, 2022
- Amblymelanoplia worcesterensis Dombrow, 2022
- Amblymelanoplia zuercherae Dombrow, 2022
- Amblymelanoplia zumpti Dombrow, 2022
