= Amblymelanoplia wittmeri =

Scientific classification
- Kingdom: Animalia
- Phylum: Arthropoda
- Class: Insecta
- Order: Coleoptera
- Suborder: Polyphaga
- Infraorder: Scarabaeiformia
- Family: Scarabaeidae
- Genus: Amblymelanoplia
- Species: A. wittmeri

Binomial name
- Amblymelanoplia wittmeri Dombrow, 2022

Species of beetle

Amblymelanoplia wittmeri is a species of beetle of the family Scarabaeidae. It is found in South Africa (Western Cape). The habitat consists of Peninsula Granite Fynbos.

== Description ==
Adults reach a length of about 11.7 mm (0.46 in). They are mostly dull black. The clypeus and head have brown setae. The pronotum has brown setae, some white scales at the posterior margin and dark-brown setae on the lateral and anterior margins. The elytra have red-brown setae and some white scales at the anterior margin.

== Life history ==
The recorded host plant is Berkheya armata.

== Etymology ==
The species is dedicated to Walter Wittmer, the former chief curator of the Coleoptera section of the Natural History Museum Basel.
