= Amblymelanoplia braunsi =

Scientific classification
- Kingdom: Animalia
- Phylum: Arthropoda
- Class: Insecta
- Order: Coleoptera
- Suborder: Polyphaga
- Infraorder: Scarabaeiformia
- Family: Scarabaeidae
- Genus: Amblymelanoplia
- Species: A. braunsi

Binomial name
- Amblymelanoplia braunsi Dombrow, 2022

Species of beetle

Amblymelanoplia braunsi is a species of beetle of the family Scarabaeidae. It is found in South Africa (Western Cape). The habitat consists of Boland Granite Fynbos.

== Description ==
Adults reach a length of about 9.9 mm (0.39 in). They are dull black, with the elytra and legs dark red-brown. The clypeus and head have brown setae. The pronotum has brown setae and dark brown setae of various lengths. The elytra have pale-brown and brown setae and a few white scales.

== Etymology ==
The species is dedicated to Dr. Justus Carl Ernst Heinrich Johannes Brauns.
