= Amblymelanoplia sulcata =

Scientific classification
- Kingdom: Animalia
- Phylum: Arthropoda
- Class: Insecta
- Order: Coleoptera
- Suborder: Polyphaga
- Infraorder: Scarabaeiformia
- Family: Scarabaeidae
- Genus: Amblymelanoplia
- Species: A. sulcata

Binomial name
- Amblymelanoplia sulcata Dombrow, 2022

Species of beetle

Amblymelanoplia sulcata is a species of beetle of the family Scarabaeidae. It is found in South Africa (Western Cape). The habitat consists of Eastern Rûens Shale Renosterveld.

== Description ==
Adults reach a length of about 9.8 mm. They are blackish red-brown, with the head and pronotum black. The clypeus has brown setae, while the setae on the head are black. The pronotum has pale-brown setae and black setae on the lateral and anterior margins. The elytra have pale-brown setae.

== Etymology ==
The species name is derived from Latin sulc (meaning a groove or furrow) and refers to the distinct groove beside the scutellum.
