= Amblymelanoplia murrayi =

Scientific classification
- Kingdom: Animalia
- Phylum: Arthropoda
- Class: Insecta
- Order: Coleoptera
- Suborder: Polyphaga
- Infraorder: Scarabaeiformia
- Family: Scarabaeidae
- Genus: Amblymelanoplia
- Species: A. murrayi

Binomial name
- Amblymelanoplia murrayi Dombrow, 2022

Species of beetle

Amblymelanoplia murrayi is a species of beetle of the family Scarabaeidae. It is found in South Africa (Western Cape).

== Description ==
Adults reach a length of about 8.9 mm. They are dark red-brown, with the head and pronotum black. The clypeus and head have black setae, while the pronotum has pale-brown setae and brown setae on the lateral and anterior margins. The elytra have pale-brown setae.

== Etymology ==
The species is dedicated to Mr Andrew Murray.
