= Amblymelanoplia nigra =

Scientific classification
- Kingdom: Animalia
- Phylum: Arthropoda
- Class: Insecta
- Order: Coleoptera
- Suborder: Polyphaga
- Infraorder: Scarabaeiformia
- Family: Scarabaeidae
- Genus: Amblymelanoplia
- Species: A. nigra

Binomial name
- Amblymelanoplia nigra Dombrow, 2022

Species of beetle

Amblymelanoplia nigra is a species of beetle of the family Scarabaeidae. It is found in South Africa (Western Cape). The habitat consists of Knersvlakte Quartz Vygieveld.

== Description ==
Adults reach a length of about 11.1 mm. They are mostly dull black. The clypeus brown setae, while the head has pale-brown and brown setae. The pronotum has brown setae, as well as dark-brown setae on the lateral and anterior margins. The elytra have short brown setae, mixed with a few white scales.

== Etymology ==
The species name is derived from Latin nigr (meaning black) and refers to the black colour of the beetle.
