= Amblymelanoplia bidentata =

Scientific classification
- Kingdom: Animalia
- Phylum: Arthropoda
- Class: Insecta
- Order: Coleoptera
- Suborder: Polyphaga
- Infraorder: Scarabaeiformia
- Family: Scarabaeidae
- Genus: Amblymelanoplia
- Species: A. bidentata

Binomial name
- Amblymelanoplia bidentata Dombrow, 2022

Species of beetle

Amblymelanoplia bidentata is a species of beetle of the family Scarabaeidae. It is found in South Africa (Western Cape).

== Description ==
Adults reach a length of about 11 mm (0.43 in). They are mostly dull black. The clypeus and the head have black setae. The pronotum has pale-brown setae, some white scales at the posterior margin and black setae on the lateral and anterior margins. The elytra have pale-brown and brown setae and some white scales at the anterior margin.

== Etymology ==
The species name is derived from Latin bi (meaning two) and dentata (meaning toothed) and refers to the pointed double headed tooth on the ventral side of the metathoracic tibia.
