= Taxonomic inflation =

Term criticizing artificial increase in the total number of recognized species

Taxonomic inflation is a pejorative term for what is perceived to be an excessive increase in the number of recognised taxa in a given context, due not to the discovery of new taxa but rather to putatively arbitrary changes to how taxa are delineated.

The best-known case is the elevation of a group of subspecies to species rank through the arbitrary decision that the differences between the various taxa warrant distinguishing them at species rank. The rise of molecular genetics is also correlated with the delineation of species based on a small number of genetic differences.

Taxonomic inflation is often claimed to occur for conservation reasons. It may be difficult to make a case for the protection of an isolated and unusual population of a common and widespread species, but it becomes much easier to do so if that population is recognised as a rare subspecies or species.

In the context of invasion biology, excessive taxonomic splitting can complicate field monitoring and management. For example, genetic studies of the highly invasive stone moroko (Pseudorasbora parva) or Black and Caspian Sea sprat (Clupeonella cultriventris) have revealed several major phylogenetic lineages coexisting sympatrically in the invasive range. Researchers note that distinguishing these lineages as separate taxa offers no practical advantage for studying the invasion process or developing control measures, advocating instead for a "cautious" taxonomic strategy to avoid falsely delimiting entities that do not represent distinct evolutionary lineages in an applied context.

== See also ==
- Mihi itch
- Taxonomic vandalism
- Lumpers and splitters
- Taxonomic bias of charismatic megafauna
