= Taxonomic vandalism =

Term in biology

Taxonomic vandalism is a term used in biology to describe the practice of publishing numerous scientifically unfounded or poorly-justified taxonomic names, often without adequate research or peer review. This phenomenon has been observed across various fields of taxonomy, but has been particularly prevalent in herpetology.

== See also ==
- Mihi itch
- Taxonomic inflation
