= Amblymelanoplia elkeae =

Scientific classification
- Kingdom: Animalia
- Phylum: Arthropoda
- Class: Insecta
- Order: Coleoptera
- Suborder: Polyphaga
- Infraorder: Scarabaeiformia
- Family: Scarabaeidae
- Genus: Amblymelanoplia
- Species: A. elkeae

Binomial name
- Amblymelanoplia elkeae Dombrow, 2022

Species of beetle

Amblymelanoplia elkeae is a species of beetle of the family Scarabaeidae. It is found in South Africa (Western Cape). The habitat consists of Hopefield Sand Fynbos.

== Description ==
Adults reach a length of about 9 mm. They are dull black. The clypeus and head have black setae. The pronotum has brown and black setae. The elytra have short, black setae, mixed with white scales.

== Life history ==
The recorded host plant is Euryops tenuissimus.

== Etymology ==
The species is dedicated to Elke Dombrow, wife of the first author.
