= Amblymelanoplia multidentata =

Scientific classification
- Kingdom: Animalia
- Phylum: Arthropoda
- Class: Insecta
- Order: Coleoptera
- Suborder: Polyphaga
- Infraorder: Scarabaeiformia
- Family: Scarabaeidae
- Genus: Amblymelanoplia
- Species: A. multidentata

Binomial name
- Amblymelanoplia multidentata Dombrow, 2022

Species of beetle

Amblymelanoplia multidentata is a species of beetle of the family Scarabaeidae. It is found in South Africa (Western Cape). The habitat consists of Koedoesberge-Moordenaars Karoo.

== Description ==
Adults reach a length of about 12.7 mm (0.50 in). They are mostly dull black, with the legs dark red-brown. The clypeus and the head have black setae. The pronotum has pale-brown setae, some white scales at the posterior margin and black setae on the lateral and anterior margins. The elytra have brown and black setae and some white scales at the anterior margin.

== Etymology ==
The species name is derived from Latin multi (meaning many) and dentata (meaning toothed) and refers to the toothed tibia of the metathoracic leg.
