= Amblymelanoplia pascoei =

Scientific classification
- Kingdom: Animalia
- Phylum: Arthropoda
- Class: Insecta
- Order: Coleoptera
- Suborder: Polyphaga
- Infraorder: Scarabaeiformia
- Family: Scarabaeidae
- Genus: Amblymelanoplia
- Species: A. pascoei

Binomial name
- Amblymelanoplia pascoei Dombrow, 2022

Species of beetle

Amblymelanoplia pascoei is a species of beetle of the family Scarabaeidae. It is found in South Africa (Western Cape).

== Description ==
Adults reach a length of about 9.6 mm. They are dull black. The clypeus and head have brown setae, while the pronotum has black setae and dark-brown setae on anterior and lateral margins. The elytra have brown setae.

== Etymology ==
The species is dedicated to Francis Polkinghorne Pascoe, a renowned English entomologist.
