= Amblymelanoplia deyrollei =

Scientific classification
- Kingdom: Animalia
- Phylum: Arthropoda
- Class: Insecta
- Order: Coleoptera
- Suborder: Polyphaga
- Infraorder: Scarabaeiformia
- Family: Scarabaeidae
- Genus: Amblymelanoplia
- Species: A. deyrollei

Binomial name
- Amblymelanoplia deyrollei Dombrow, 2022

Species of beetle

Amblymelanoplia deyrollei is a species of beetle of the family Scarabaeidae. It is found in South Africa (Western Cape).

== Description ==
Adults reach a length of about 9 mm. They are dark red-brown, with the head, clypeus, pronotum and scutellum black. The clypeus has brown setae, while the setae are black on the head. The pronotum has brown and dark-brown setae. The elytra have short, brown setae.

== Etymology ==
The species is dedicated to French naturalist Achille Deyrolle.
