= Amblymelanoplia montana =

Scientific classification
- Kingdom: Animalia
- Phylum: Arthropoda
- Class: Insecta
- Order: Coleoptera
- Suborder: Polyphaga
- Infraorder: Scarabaeiformia
- Family: Scarabaeidae
- Genus: Amblymelanoplia
- Species: A. montana

Binomial name
- Amblymelanoplia montana Dombrow, 2022

Species of beetle

Amblymelanoplia montana is a species of beetle of the family Scarabaeidae. It is found in South Africa (Western Cape). The habitat consists of Boland Granite Fynbos.

== Description ==
Adults reach a length of about 10.4 mm (0.41 in). They are dull black, with the antennae lustrous black. The clypeus has brown setae, while the setae on the head are black. The pronotum has pale-brown and brown setae, as well as dark-brown setae on the lateral and anterior margins. The elytra have brown setae.

== Life history ==
The recorded host plant is Berkheya barbata.

== Etymology ==
The species name is derived from Latin montana (meaning mountain) and refers to the place of capture, the mountains near Stellenbosch.
