= Amblymelanoplia baehri =

Scientific classification
- Kingdom: Animalia
- Phylum: Arthropoda
- Class: Insecta
- Order: Coleoptera
- Suborder: Polyphaga
- Infraorder: Scarabaeiformia
- Family: Scarabaeidae
- Genus: Amblymelanoplia
- Species: A. baehri

Binomial name
- Amblymelanoplia baehri Dombrow, 2022

Species of beetle

Amblymelanoplia baehri is a species of beetle of the family Scarabaeidae. It is found in South Africa (Western Cape).

== Description ==
Adults reach a length of about 9.9 mm. They are dark red brown, with the head and pronotum dull black. The clypeus and head have brown setae, while the setae on the pronotum has, brown setae of various lengths. The setae on the elytra are short and pale-brown.

== Etymology ==
The species is dedicated to Dr. Martin Baehr, the former chief curator of the Coleoptera department of the Zoological State Collection of the Bavarian State.
