= Amblymelanoplia aequabilis =

Scientific classification
- Kingdom: Animalia
- Phylum: Arthropoda
- Class: Insecta
- Order: Coleoptera
- Suborder: Polyphaga
- Infraorder: Scarabaeiformia
- Family: Scarabaeidae
- Genus: Amblymelanoplia
- Species: A. aequabilis

Binomial name
- Amblymelanoplia aequabilis Dombrow, 2022

Species of beetle

Amblymelanoplia aequabilis is a species of beetle of the family Scarabaeidae. It is found in South Africa (Western Cape).

== Description ==
Adults reach a length of about 10.8 mm (0.43 in). They are mostly dull black. The clypeus and the head have black setae. The pronotum has pale-brown and brown setae and some white scales at the posterior margin. The elytra have brown setae and some white scales at the anterior margin.

== Etymology ==
The species name is derived from aequabilis (meaning uniform) and refers to the very even sculpture of the elytra.
