= Amblymelanoplia cavitibialis =

Scientific classification
- Kingdom: Animalia
- Phylum: Arthropoda
- Class: Insecta
- Order: Coleoptera
- Suborder: Polyphaga
- Infraorder: Scarabaeiformia
- Family: Scarabaeidae
- Genus: Amblymelanoplia
- Species: A. cavitibialis

Binomial name
- Amblymelanoplia cavitibialis Dombrow, 2002

Species of beetle

Amblymelanoplia cavitibialis is a species of beetle of the family Scarabaeidae. It is found in South Africa (Western Cape). The habitat consists of Knersvlakte Shale Vygieveld.

== Description ==
Adults reach a length of about 9.5 mm. They are dull black. The head and clypeus have brown setae, while the pronotum has pale-brown and brown setae and a band of white scales along the lateral margin and some short black setae on the lateral margin. The elytra have brown setae and white scales.
