= Amblymelanoplia septentrionalestris =

Scientific classification
- Kingdom: Animalia
- Phylum: Arthropoda
- Class: Insecta
- Order: Coleoptera
- Suborder: Polyphaga
- Infraorder: Scarabaeiformia
- Family: Scarabaeidae
- Genus: Amblymelanoplia
- Species: A. septentrionalestris

Binomial name
- Amblymelanoplia septentrionalestris Dombrow, 2022

Species of beetle

Amblymelanoplia septentrionalestris is a species of beetle of the family Scarabaeidae. It is found in South Africa (Northern Cape). The habitat consists of Namaqualand Blomveld.

== Description ==
Adults reach a length of about 11.7 mm (0.46 in). They are mostly dull black. The clypeus and head have black setae. The pronotum has brown setae, some white scales along the posterior margin, as well as black setae at the lateral and anterior margins. The elytra have brown setae and some white scales.

== Etymology ==
The species name is derived from Latin septentri (meaning north) and refers to the most northern known distribution of the genus.
