= Amblymelanoplia enodisuturalis =

Scientific classification
- Kingdom: Animalia
- Phylum: Arthropoda
- Class: Insecta
- Order: Coleoptera
- Suborder: Polyphaga
- Infraorder: Scarabaeiformia
- Family: Scarabaeidae
- Genus: Amblymelanoplia
- Species: A. enodisuturalis

Binomial name
- Amblymelanoplia enodisuturalis Dombrow, 2022

Species of beetle

Amblymelanoplia enodisuturalis is a species of beetle of the family Scarabaeidae. It is found in South Africa (Western Cape).

== Description ==
Adults reach a length of about 10.6 mm (0.42 in). They are mostly dull black. The clypeus and the head have black setae. The pronotum has pale-brown setae, as well as some white scales and black setae at the anterior and posterior margins. The elytra have pale-brown setae, as well as black setae.

== Etymology ==
The species name is derived from Latin enodi (meaning smooth) and refers to the complanate suture on the elytra.
