= Amblymelanoplia mamreensis =

Scientific classification
- Kingdom: Animalia
- Phylum: Arthropoda
- Class: Insecta
- Order: Coleoptera
- Suborder: Polyphaga
- Infraorder: Scarabaeiformia
- Family: Scarabaeidae
- Genus: Amblymelanoplia
- Species: A. mamreensis

Binomial name
- Amblymelanoplia mamreensis Dombrow, 2022

Species of beetle

Amblymelanoplia mamreensis is a species of beetle of the family Scarabaeidae. It is found in South Africa (Western Cape). The habitat consists of Atlantis Sand Fynbos.

== Description ==
Adults reach a length of about 9.3 mm. They are dull black, with the elytra blackish dark red-brown and the legs dark red-brown. The clypeus black setae, while these are brown on the head. The pronotum has brown setae and dark-brown setae on the lateral and anterior margins. The elytra have brown setae, mixed with pale-brown setae.

== Etymology ==
The species name refers to the place of capture, the small town of Mamre in the south of the Western Cape Province.
