= Amblymelanoplia selbi =

Scientific classification
- Kingdom: Animalia
- Phylum: Arthropoda
- Class: Insecta
- Order: Coleoptera
- Suborder: Polyphaga
- Infraorder: Scarabaeiformia
- Family: Scarabaeidae
- Genus: Amblymelanoplia
- Species: A. selbi

Binomial name
- Amblymelanoplia selbi Dombrow, 2022

Species of beetle

Amblymelanoplia selbi is a species of beetle of the family Scarabaeidae. It is found in South Africa (Western Cape). The habitat consists of Breede Alluvium Fynbos.

== Description ==
Adults reach a length of about 9.9–10.2 mm (0.39–0.40 in). They are mostly dull black. The clypeus and the head have black setae. The pronotum has black setae and some white scales at the posterior margin. The elytra have black setae and some white scales at the anterior margin.

== Life history ==
The recorded host plants are Euryops species.

== Etymology ==
The species is dedicated to the South African lepidopterist Mr. Harald Selb.
