= Amblymelanoplia lajoyei =

Scientific classification
- Kingdom: Animalia
- Phylum: Arthropoda
- Class: Insecta
- Order: Coleoptera
- Suborder: Polyphaga
- Infraorder: Scarabaeiformia
- Family: Scarabaeidae
- Genus: Amblymelanoplia
- Species: A. lajoyei

Binomial name
- Amblymelanoplia lajoyei Dombrow, 2022

Species of beetle

Amblymelanoplia lajoyei is a species of beetle of the family Scarabaeidae. It is found in South Africa (Western Cape).

== Description ==
Adults reach a length of about 9.5 mm. They are dull black, with some dark red-brown areas. The clypeus has brown setae, while these are black on the head. The pronotum has pale-brown setae and red-brown setae on the lateral and anterior margins. The elytra have brown setae.

== Etymology ==
The species is dedicated to the French entomologist Lambert Abel Lajoye.
