= Amblymelanoplia goodhopensis =

Scientific classification
- Kingdom: Animalia
- Phylum: Arthropoda
- Class: Insecta
- Order: Coleoptera
- Suborder: Polyphaga
- Infraorder: Scarabaeiformia
- Family: Scarabaeidae
- Genus: Amblymelanoplia
- Species: A. goodhopensis

Binomial name
- Amblymelanoplia goodhopensis Dombrow, 2022

Species of beetle

Amblymelanoplia goodhopensis is a species of beetle of the family Scarabaeidae. It is found in South Africa (Western Cape). The habitat consists of North Sonderend Sandstone Fynbos.

== Description ==
Adults reach a length of about 9.5 mm. They are mostly black. The clypeus and the head have black setae, while the pronotum has dark-brown setae mixed with brown setae. There are also black setae on the lateral and anterior margins. The elytra have short, brown setae mixed with black setae.

== Etymology ==
The species name refers to the place of capture near the Farm Good Hope in the Riversonderend Catchment Area.
