= Amblymelanoplia macrodentata =

Scientific classification
- Kingdom: Animalia
- Phylum: Arthropoda
- Class: Insecta
- Order: Coleoptera
- Suborder: Polyphaga
- Infraorder: Scarabaeiformia
- Family: Scarabaeidae
- Genus: Amblymelanoplia
- Species: A. macrodentata

Binomial name
- Amblymelanoplia macrodentata Dombrow, 2022

Species of beetle

Amblymelanoplia macrodentata is a species of beetle of the family Scarabaeidae. It is found in South Africa (Western Cape).

== Description ==
Adults reach a length of about 11.4 mm (0.45 in). They are mostly dull black, with the legs dark red-brown. The clypeus and the head have brown setae. The pronotum has pale-brown setae, a band of white scales at the posterior margin, and black setae on the lateral and anterior margins. The elytra have pale-brown and black setae and some white scales at the anterior margin.

== Etymology ==
The species name is derived from Latin macro (meaning big) and dentat (meaning toothed) and refers to the distinct dentation of the metathoracic pretarsomere.
