= Amblymelanoplia sprecherae =

Scientific classification
- Kingdom: Animalia
- Phylum: Arthropoda
- Class: Insecta
- Order: Coleoptera
- Suborder: Polyphaga
- Infraorder: Scarabaeiformia
- Family: Scarabaeidae
- Genus: Amblymelanoplia
- Species: A. sprecherae

Binomial name
- Amblymelanoplia sprecherae Dombrow, 2022

Species of beetle

Amblymelanoplia sprecherae is a species of beetle of the family Scarabaeidae. It is found in South Africa (Western Cape). The habitat consists of Boland Granite Fynbos.

== Description ==
Adults reach a length of about 9.8 mm. They are mostly dull black, with the pygidium and thoracic legs dark red brown. The clypeus and the head have short black setae. The pronotum has pale-brown and black setae on the lateral and anterior margins. The elytra have black setae of various lengths.

== Etymology ==
The species is dedicated to Mrs. Eva Sprecher-Uebersax, curator of the Frey collection at the Natural History Museum Basel.
