= Amblymelanoplia strigata =

Scientific classification
- Kingdom: Animalia
- Phylum: Arthropoda
- Class: Insecta
- Order: Coleoptera
- Suborder: Polyphaga
- Infraorder: Scarabaeiformia
- Family: Scarabaeidae
- Genus: Amblymelanoplia
- Species: A. strigata

Binomial name
- Amblymelanoplia strigata Dombrow, 2022

Species of beetle

Amblymelanoplia strigata is a species of beetle of the family Scarabaeidae. It is found in South Africa (Western Cape).

== Description ==
Adults reach a length of about 9.7 mm (0.38 in). They are dark red-brown, with the head, clypeus, pronotum and scutellum blackish-brown. The clypeus and the head have black setae. The pronotum has brown setae and some white scales at the posterior margin. The elytra have brown setae.

== Etymology ==
The species name is derived from Latin striga (meaning a furrow or groove) and refers to the medial furrow of the pronotum.
