= Amblymelanoplia glenlyonensis =

Scientific classification
- Kingdom: Animalia
- Phylum: Arthropoda
- Class: Insecta
- Order: Coleoptera
- Suborder: Polyphaga
- Infraorder: Scarabaeiformia
- Family: Scarabaeidae
- Genus: Amblymelanoplia
- Species: A. glenlyonensis

Binomial name
- Amblymelanoplia glenlyonensis Dombrow, 2022

Species of beetle

Amblymelanoplia glenlyonensis is a species of beetle of the family Scarabaeidae. It is found in South Africa (Northern Cape). The habitat consists of Bokkeveld Sandstone Fynbos.

== Description ==
Adults reach a length of about 9.8 mm. They are dull black. The clypeus and head have black setae. The pronotum has brown setae and longer black setae. The elytra have short brown setae.

== Life history ==
The recorded host plant is Berkheya glabrata.

== Etymology ==
The species name refers to the Farm Glenlyon near Nieuwoudtville.
