= Amblymelanoplia castanea =

Scientific classification
- Kingdom: Animalia
- Phylum: Arthropoda
- Class: Insecta
- Order: Coleoptera
- Suborder: Polyphaga
- Infraorder: Scarabaeiformia
- Family: Scarabaeidae
- Genus: Amblymelanoplia
- Species: A. castanea

Binomial name
- Amblymelanoplia castanea Dombrow, 2022

Species of beetle

Amblymelanoplia castanea is a species of beetle of the family Scarabaeidae. It is found in South Africa.

== Description ==
Adults reach a length of about 10.4 mm (0.41 in). They are dull blackish red-brown, with the head and pronotum black and the antennae red-brown. The clypeus and head have brown setae. The pronotum has brown setae and some white scales at the posterior margin. The elytra have brown setae.

== Etymology ==
The species name is derived from Latin castane (meaning chestnut) and refers to the colour of the species.
