= Amblymelanoplia webbi =

Scientific classification
- Kingdom: Animalia
- Phylum: Arthropoda
- Class: Insecta
- Order: Coleoptera
- Suborder: Polyphaga
- Infraorder: Scarabaeiformia
- Family: Scarabaeidae
- Genus: Amblymelanoplia
- Species: A. webbi

Binomial name
- Amblymelanoplia webbi Dombrow, 2022

Species of beetle

Amblymelanoplia webbi is a species of beetle of the family Scarabaeidae. It is found in South Africa (Limpopo). The habitat consists of Woodbush Granite Grassland.

== Description ==
Adults reach a length of about 11.8 mm (0.46 in). They are dull black. The clypeus and head have black setae. The pronotum has dark-brown setae, a few white scales at the posterior margin and black setae at the lateral and anterior margins. The elytra have black setae and, at the anterior margin, some white scales.

== Etymology ==
The species is dedicated to the naturalist and photographer Mr Peter Webb, who collected the species.
