= Amblymelanoplia jekeli =

Scientific classification
- Kingdom: Animalia
- Phylum: Arthropoda
- Class: Insecta
- Order: Coleoptera
- Suborder: Polyphaga
- Infraorder: Scarabaeiformia
- Family: Scarabaeidae
- Genus: Amblymelanoplia
- Species: A. jekeli

Binomial name
- Amblymelanoplia jekeli Dombrow, 2022

Species of beetle

Amblymelanoplia jekeli is a species of beetle of the family Scarabaeidae. It is found in South Africa (Western Cape).

== Description ==
Adults reach a length of about 9.1 mm. They are dull black. The clypeus has brown setae, while the setae on the head are black. The pronotum has brown and dark-brown setae on the anterior and lateral margins. The elytra have brown setae.

== Etymology ==
The species is dedicated to Henri Jekel, an insect dealer in Paris.
