= Amblymelanoplia thomsoni =

Scientific classification
- Kingdom: Animalia
- Phylum: Arthropoda
- Class: Insecta
- Order: Coleoptera
- Suborder: Polyphaga
- Infraorder: Scarabaeiformia
- Family: Scarabaeidae
- Genus: Amblymelanoplia
- Species: A. thomsoni

Binomial name
- Amblymelanoplia thomsoni Dombrow, 2022

Species of beetle

Amblymelanoplia thomsoni is a species of beetle of the family Scarabaeidae. It is found in South Africa (Western Cape).

== Description ==
Adults reach a length of about 8.2 mm (0.32 in). They are mostly dull black, with the legs dark red-brown. The clypeus and the head have black setae. The pronotum has brown setae and black setae on the anterior and lateral margins. The elytra have brown setae.

== Etymology ==
The species is dedicated to the American entomologist Mr James Livingston Thomson.
