= Amblymelanoplia cederbergensis =

Scientific classification
- Kingdom: Animalia
- Phylum: Arthropoda
- Class: Insecta
- Order: Coleoptera
- Suborder: Polyphaga
- Infraorder: Scarabaeiformia
- Family: Scarabaeidae
- Genus: Amblymelanoplia
- Species: A. cederbergensis

Binomial name
- Amblymelanoplia cederbergensis Dombrow, 2022

Species of beetle

Amblymelanoplia cederbergensis is a species of beetle of the family Scarabaeidae. It is found in South Africa (Western Cape). The habitat consists of Olifants Sandstone Fynbos.

== Description ==
Adults reach a length of about 10.4 mm (0.41 in). They are mostly dull black. The clypeus and head have black setae. The pronotum has brown setae, some white scales at the posterior margin and black setae on the lateral and anterior margins. The elytra have black setae and some white scales at the anterior margin.

== Life history ==
The recorded host plant is Euryops tenuissimus.

== Etymology ==
The species name refers to the place of capture, the Cederberg mountains.
