= Amblymelanoplia fusca =

Scientific classification
- Kingdom: Animalia
- Phylum: Arthropoda
- Class: Insecta
- Order: Coleoptera
- Suborder: Polyphaga
- Infraorder: Scarabaeiformia
- Family: Scarabaeidae
- Genus: Amblymelanoplia
- Species: A. fusca

Binomial name
- Amblymelanoplia fusca Dombrow, 2022

Species of beetle

Amblymelanoplia fusca is a species of beetle of the family Scarabaeidae. It is found in South Africa (Western Cape). The habitat consists of Boland Granite Fynbos.

== Description ==
Adults reach a length of about 10.2 mm. They are blackish red-brown, with the head and pronotum black. The clypeus and the head have brown setae, while the pronotum has pale-brown setae, mixed with brown setae. The elytra have brown setae.

== Etymology ==
The species name is derived from Latin fusc (meaning brown) and refers to the dark red-brown colour of the integument.
