= Amblymelanoplia obscura =

Scientific classification
- Kingdom: Animalia
- Phylum: Arthropoda
- Class: Insecta
- Order: Coleoptera
- Suborder: Polyphaga
- Infraorder: Scarabaeiformia
- Family: Scarabaeidae
- Genus: Amblymelanoplia
- Species: A. obscura

Binomial name
- Amblymelanoplia obscura Dombrow, 2022

Species of beetle

Amblymelanoplia obscura is a species of beetle of the family Scarabaeidae. It is found in South Africa (Mpumalanga). The habitat consists of Granite Lowveld.

== Description ==
Adults reach a length of about 11 mm (0.43 in). They are dull black, with the antennae dark-brown and the elytra dark red-brown. The clypeus and head have black setae. The pronotum has brown setae, some white scales at the posterior margin and dark-brown setae on the lateral and anterior margins. The elytra have brown setae and some white scales at the anterior margin.

== Etymology ==
The species name is derived from Latin obscur (meaning dark) and refers to the dark colour of the species.
