= Amblymelanoplia alluaudi =

Scientific classification
- Kingdom: Animalia
- Phylum: Arthropoda
- Class: Insecta
- Order: Coleoptera
- Suborder: Polyphaga
- Infraorder: Scarabaeiformia
- Family: Scarabaeidae
- Genus: Amblymelanoplia
- Species: A. alluaudi

Binomial name
- Amblymelanoplia alluaudi Dombrow, 2022

Species of beetle

Amblymelanoplia alluaudi is a species of beetle of the family Scarabaeidae. It is found in South Africa (Western Cape).

== Description ==
Adults reach a length of about 10 mm. They are dull black, with the antennae dark red-brown. The clypeus has short black setae, while these are somewhat longer on the head. The pronotum has mixed pale-brown and brown setae of various lengths, while the elytra have very short pale-brown setae.

== Etymology ==
The species is dedicated to French entomologist Charles A. Alluaud.
