= Amblymelanoplia klassi =

Scientific classification
- Kingdom: Animalia
- Phylum: Arthropoda
- Class: Insecta
- Order: Coleoptera
- Suborder: Polyphaga
- Infraorder: Scarabaeiformia
- Family: Scarabaeidae
- Genus: Amblymelanoplia
- Species: A. klassi

Binomial name
- Amblymelanoplia klassi Dombrow, 2022

Species of beetle

Amblymelanoplia klassi is a species of beetle of the family Scarabaeidae. It is found in South Africa (Western Cape).

== Description ==
Adults reach a length of about 11.3 mm (0.44 in). They are mostly dull black. The clypeus and the head have black setae. The pronotum has pale-brown and brown setae, some white scales at the margins and black setae on the lateral and anterior margins. The elytra have pale-brown and brown setae and some white scales at the anterior margin.

== Etymology ==
The species is dedicated to Dr. Klaus Klass, curator of the Coleoptera section of the Senckenberg Natural History Collection Dresden.
