= Amblymelanoplia tuberculata =

Scientific classification
- Kingdom: Animalia
- Phylum: Arthropoda
- Class: Insecta
- Order: Coleoptera
- Suborder: Polyphaga
- Infraorder: Scarabaeiformia
- Family: Scarabaeidae
- Genus: Amblymelanoplia
- Species: A. tuberculata

Binomial name
- Amblymelanoplia tuberculata Dombrow, 2022

Species of beetle

Amblymelanoplia tuberculata is a species of beetle of the family Scarabaeidae. It is found in South Africa (Western Cape). The habitat consists of Montagu Shale Renosterveld.

== Description ==
Adults reach a length of about 11.3 mm (0.44 in). They are dark red-brown, with the clypeus, head, pronotum and scutellum black. The clypeus and the head have black setae. The pronotum has brown setae, some white scales on the posterior margin and dark-brown setae on the lateral and anterior margins. The elytra have brown setae and a few white scales at the anterior margin.

== Etymology ==
The species name refers to the large flattened tubercles on the head.
