= Bambi effect =

Objection to killing animals perceived as "cute" or otherwise desirable

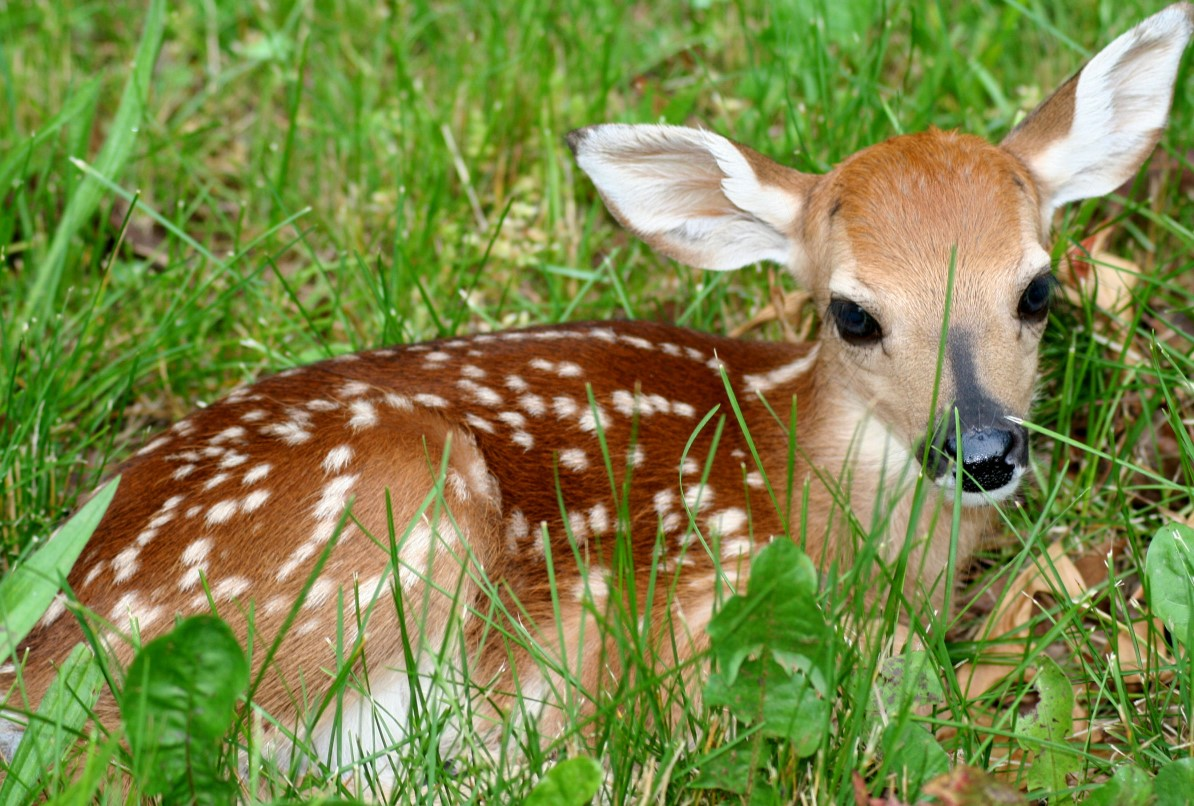
A white-tailed deer fawn, the species of the title character in Walt Disney's 1942 animated film Bambi.

The "Bambi effect" is an objection to the killing of animals that the individual has a fondness of, while there may be little or no objection to the suffering of animals that are perceived as less lovable.

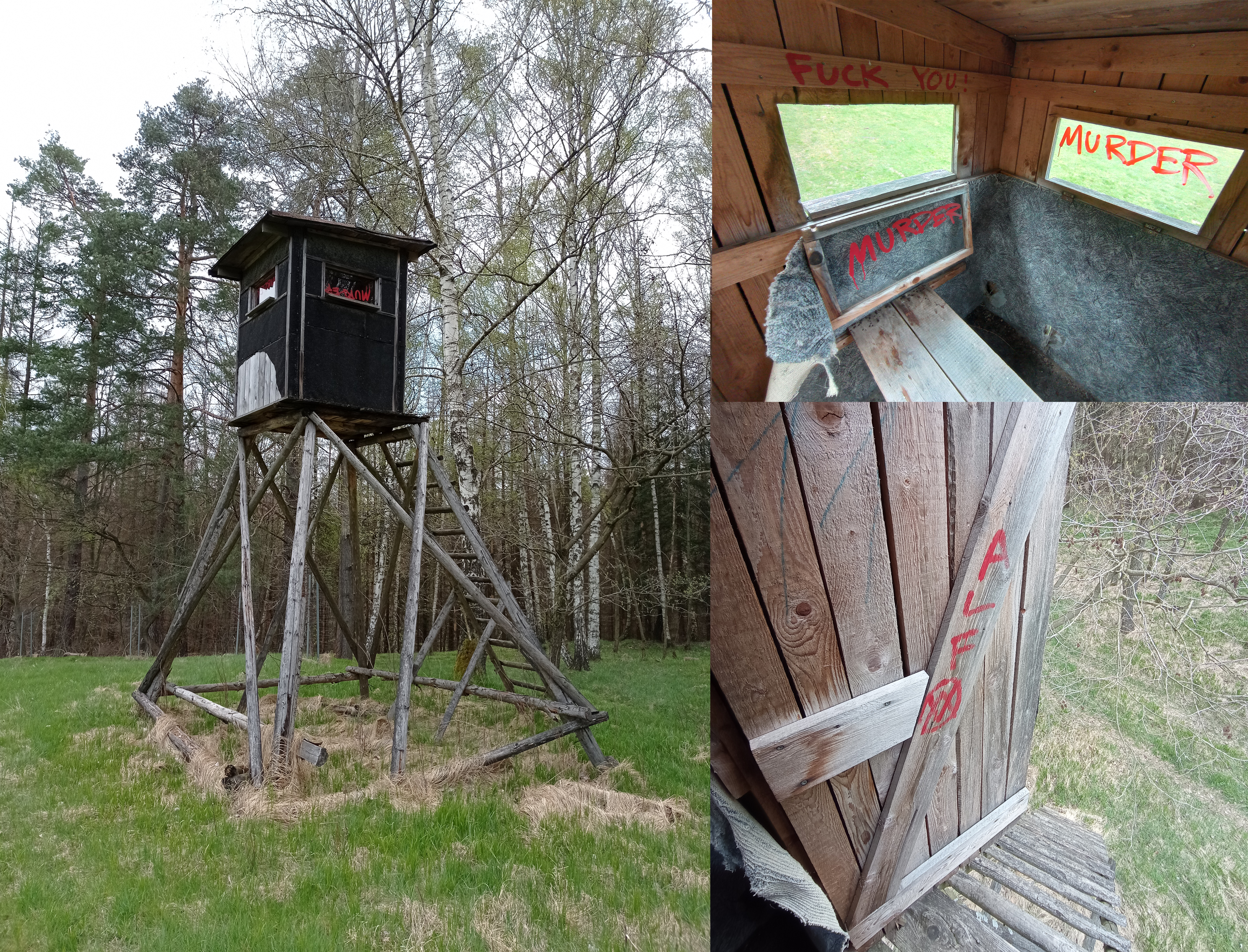
Deer blind vandalized by activists from ALF (Animal Liberation Front). Czech Republic, 2020

Referring to a form of purported anthropomorphism, the term is inspired by Walt Disney's 1942 animated film Bambi, where an emotional high point is the death of the lead character's mother at the hands of the film's antagonist, a hunter known only as "Man".

== Effects ==
Some commentators have credited this purported effect with increasing public awareness of the dangers of pollution, for instance in the case of the fate of sea otters after the Exxon Valdez oil spill, and in the public interest in scaring birds off airfields in non-lethal ways. In the case of invasive species, perceived cuteness may help thwart efforts to eradicate non-native intruders, such as the white fallow deer in Point Reyes, California.

The effect was also cited in the events following a record snowfall in the U.S. state of Colorado in 2007, when food for mule deer, pronghorns, and elk became so scarce that they began to starve; the Colorado Department of Wildlife was inundated with requests and offers to help the animals from citizens, and ended up spending almost $2 million feeding the hungry wildlife. Among some butchers, the Bambi effect (and in general, Walt Disney's anthropomorphic characters) is credited with fueling the vegan movement; chefs use the term to describe customers' lack of interest in, for instance, whole fish: "It's the Bambi effect – [customers] don't want to see eyes looking at them".

The Bambi effect has caused people to fight against organizations that manage wildlife. However, their intervention can often interfere with an ecosystem’s circle of life, and thus, their efforts become counterproductive. For example, this phenomenon can promote people to create organizations like the Smokey Bear campaign, which decreased the number of fires but also led to unexpected ecological changes. The Bambi effect is backed up by a study (Wilks, 2008) which found that to help more aggressive and unfriendly wildlife become more loved and see improvements in their environments, cuter and more innocent cartoons should be created and marketed for them.

== See also ==
- Animal welfare
- Animal rights
- Charismatic megafauna
- Cruelty to animals
- Poaching
- Pretty privilege
