= Amblymelanoplia kulzeri =

Scientific classification
- Kingdom: Animalia
- Phylum: Arthropoda
- Class: Insecta
- Order: Coleoptera
- Suborder: Polyphaga
- Infraorder: Scarabaeiformia
- Family: Scarabaeidae
- Genus: Amblymelanoplia
- Species: A. kulzeri

Binomial name
- Amblymelanoplia kulzeri Dombrow, 2022

Species of beetle

Amblymelanoplia kulzeri is a species of beetle of the family Scarabaeidae. It is found in South Africa (Western Cape). The habitat consists of Boland Granite Fynbos.

== Description ==
Adults reach a length of about 10.2 mm. They are mostly dull black, with dark red-brown areas. The clypeus has brown setae, while the setae on the head are black. The pronotum has brown setae and dark-brown setae on the lateral and anterior margins. The elytra have pale-brown setae, mixed with a few white scales, as well as with brown setae.

== Etymology ==
The species is dedicated to Mr Hans Kulzer, former curator in the Zoological State Collection Munich.
