= Amblymelanoplia burmeisteri =

Scientific classification
- Kingdom: Animalia
- Phylum: Arthropoda
- Class: Insecta
- Order: Coleoptera
- Suborder: Polyphaga
- Infraorder: Scarabaeiformia
- Family: Scarabaeidae
- Genus: Amblymelanoplia
- Species: A. burmeisteri

Binomial name
- Amblymelanoplia burmeisteri Dombrow, 2022

Species of beetle

Amblymelanoplia burmeisteri is a species of beetle of the family Scarabaeidae. It is found in South Africa (Western Cape).

== Description ==
Adults reach a length of about 10 mm. They are dull black, with the antennae dark red-brown. The head has brown setae. The pronotum has a bare, roundish patch, but is the rest has short pale-brown setae and brown setae on the anterior and lateral margins. The elytra have short, pale-brown setae.

== Etymology ==
The species is dedicated to the naturalist Karl Hermann Konrad Burmeister.
