= Amblymelanoplia stellenboschensis =

Scientific classification
- Kingdom: Animalia
- Phylum: Arthropoda
- Class: Insecta
- Order: Coleoptera
- Suborder: Polyphaga
- Infraorder: Scarabaeiformia
- Family: Scarabaeidae
- Genus: Amblymelanoplia
- Species: A. stellenboschensis

Binomial name
- Amblymelanoplia stellenboschensis Dombrow, 2022

Species of beetle

Amblymelanoplia stellenboschensis is a species of beetle of the family Scarabaeidae. It is found in South Africa (Western Cape). The habitat consists of Boland Granite Fynbos.

== Description ==
Adults reach a length of about 9.2 mm (0.36 in). They are dull black, with the antennae dark red-brown and the pygidium dark red-brown. The clypeus and head have brown setae. The pronotum has pale-brown and a few brown setae, as well as dark-brown setae on the lateral and anterior margins. On posterior margin, there are also some white scales. The elytra have brown setae and whitish scales.

== Etymology ==
The species name refers to the place of capture, Stellenbosch.
