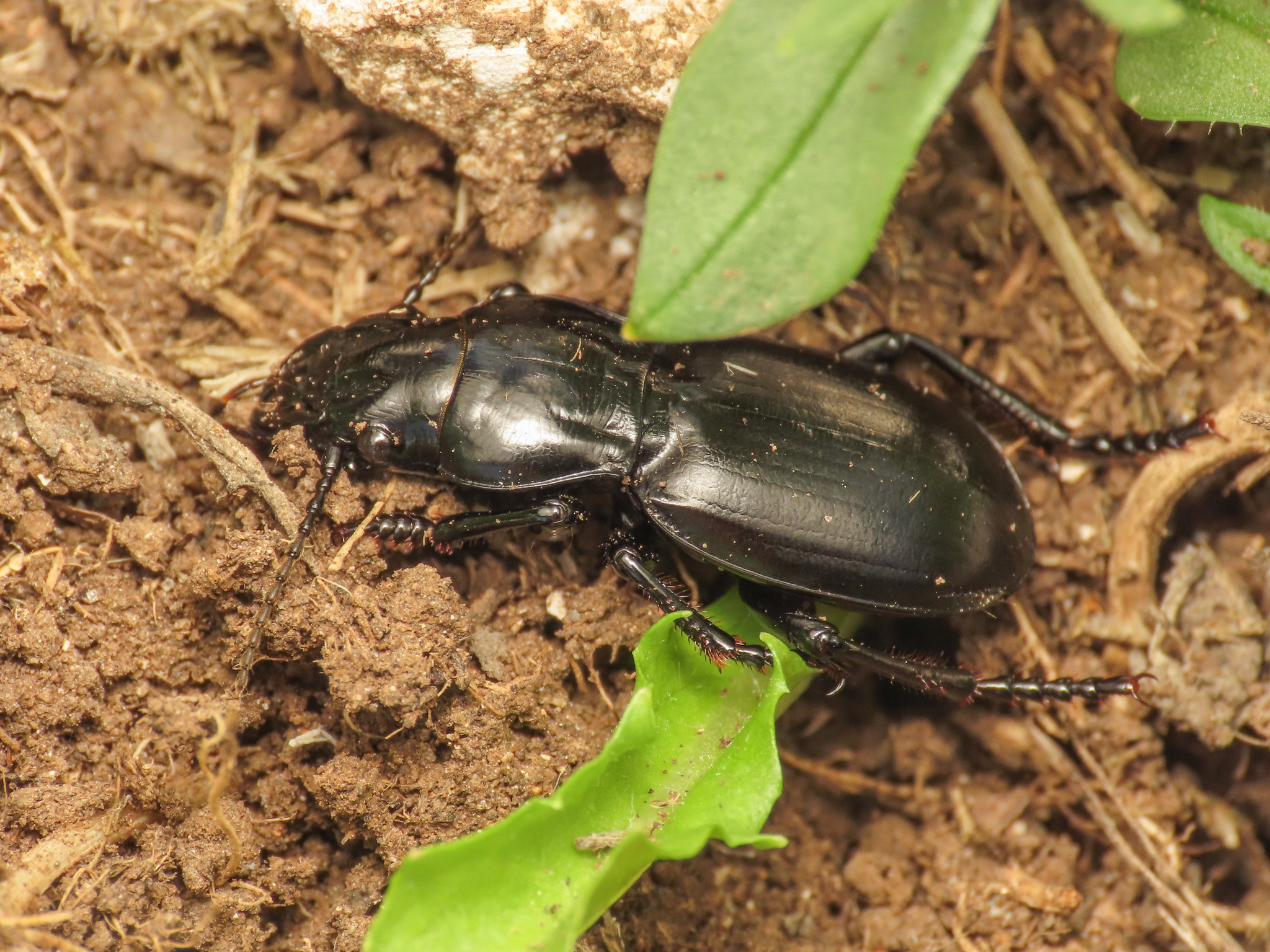
- Percus dejeani, Italy

Scientific classification
- Domain: Eukaryota
- Kingdom: Animalia
- Phylum: Arthropoda
- Class: Insecta
- Order: Coleoptera
- Suborder: Adephaga
- Family: Carabidae
- Subfamily: Pterostichinae
- Tribe: Pterostichini
- Subtribe: Pterostichina
- Genus: Percus; Bonelli, 1810

Subgenera
- Percus Bonelli, 1810; Pseudopercus Motschulsky, 1866

= Percus =

Genus of beetles

Percus is a genus in the beetle family Carabidae. There are about 19 described species in Percus, found in southern Europe and North Africa.

Percus plicatus

== Species ==
These 19 species belong to the genus Percus:

- Percus andreinii Mainardi, 1914 (Italy)
- Percus bilineatus (Dejean, 1828) (Italy)
- Percus corrugatus (Billberg, 1815) (Sicily and Italy)
- Percus corsicus (Audinet-Serville, 1821) (France and Corse)
- Percus cylindricus Chaudoir, 1868 (Sardinia and Italy)
- Percus dejeanii (Dejean, 1831) (Italy)
- Percus espagnoli Lagar Mascaro, 1965 (Spain and Baleares)
- Percus grandicollis (Audinet-Serville, 1821) (France, Corse, Sardinia, and Italy)
- Percus guiraoi Perez-Arcas, 1869 (Spain)
- Percus lineatus (Solier, 1835) (Sicily, Italy, Algeria, and Tunisia)
- Percus passerinii (Dejean, 1828) (Italy)
- Percus patruelis (L.Dufour, 1820) (France and Spain)
- Percus paykullii (P.Rossi, 1792) (Italy)
- Percus plicatus (Dejean, 1828) (Spain and Baleares)
- Percus politus (Dejean, 1831) (Spain)
- Percus reichei (Kraatz, 1858) (France and Corse)
- Percus strictus (Dejean, 1828) (France, Corse, Sardinia, and Italy)
- Percus stultus (L.Dufour, 1820) (Spain)
- Percus villae (Kraatz, 1858) (France and Italy)
