= Amblymelanoplia cornuta =

Scientific classification
- Kingdom: Animalia
- Phylum: Arthropoda
- Class: Insecta
- Order: Coleoptera
- Suborder: Polyphaga
- Infraorder: Scarabaeiformia
- Family: Scarabaeidae
- Genus: Amblymelanoplia
- Species: A. cornuta

Binomial name
- Amblymelanoplia cornuta Dombrow, 2002

Species of beetle

Amblymelanoplia cornuta is a species of beetle of the family Scarabaeidae. It is found in South Africa (Western Cape). The habitat consists of Boland Granite Fynbos.

== Description ==
Adults reach a length of about 10.1 mm (0.40 in). They are mostly dull black, with some legs reddish-black and some dark red-brown. The clypeus and the head have black setae. The pronotum has brown setae, some white scales at the posterior margin and black setae on the lateral and anterior margins. The elytra have brown setae and some white scales at the anterior margin.
