= Amblymelanoplia dregei =

Scientific classification
- Kingdom: Animalia
- Phylum: Arthropoda
- Class: Insecta
- Order: Coleoptera
- Suborder: Polyphaga
- Infraorder: Scarabaeiformia
- Family: Scarabaeidae
- Genus: Amblymelanoplia
- Species: A. dregei

Binomial name
- Amblymelanoplia dregei Dombrow, 2022

Species of beetle

Amblymelanoplia dregei is a species of beetle of the family Scarabaeidae. It is found in South Africa (Western Cape).

== Description ==
Adults reach a length of about 9.5 mm. They are dark red-brown, with the head, pronotum and scutellum dull black. The clypeus and head have black setae, while the pronotum has red-brown setae, mixed with brown setae. The elytra have pale-brown setae mixed with brown setae.

== Etymology ==
The species is dedicated to Carl Friedrich Drège, an apothecary in Cape Town and collector of botanical and zoological specimens.
