= Amblymelanoplia pulchra =

Scientific classification
- Kingdom: Animalia
- Phylum: Arthropoda
- Class: Insecta
- Order: Coleoptera
- Suborder: Polyphaga
- Infraorder: Scarabaeiformia
- Family: Scarabaeidae
- Genus: Amblymelanoplia
- Species: A. pulchra

Binomial name
- Amblymelanoplia pulchra Dombrow, 2022

Species of beetle

Amblymelanoplia pulchra is a species of beetle of the family Scarabaeidae. It is found in South Africa (Western Cape).

== Description ==
Adults reach a length of about 11.2 mm. They are mostly dull black. The clypeus and head have brown setae, while the pronotum has brown setae, as well as dark-brown setae on the lateral and anterior margins. The elytra have brown setae, mixed with a few white scales.

== Etymology ==
The species name is derived from Latin pulch (meaning beautiful) and refers to the beautiful matt integument.
