= Amblymelanoplia spinipes =

Scientific classification
- Kingdom: Animalia
- Phylum: Arthropoda
- Clade: Pancrustacea
- Class: Insecta
- Order: Coleoptera
- Suborder: Polyphaga
- Infraorder: Scarabaeiformia
- Family: Scarabaeidae
- Genus: Amblymelanoplia
- Species: A. spinipes

Binomial name
- Amblymelanoplia spinipes (Fabricius, 1781)

Synonyms
- Melolontha spinipes Fabricius, 1781; Monochelus spinipes

Species of beetle

Amblymelanoplia spinipes is a species of beetle of the family Scarabaeidae. It is found in South Africa (Western Cape).

== Description ==
Adults reach a length of about 10.5 mm. They are mostly dull black, with the abdomen dark red-brown. The clypeus and head have brown setae, while the pronotum has brown setae and dark-brown setae on the lateral and anterior margins. The elytra have pale-brown setae, mixed with brown setae.
