= Amblymelanoplia soetwaterensis =

Scientific classification
- Kingdom: Animalia
- Phylum: Arthropoda
- Class: Insecta
- Order: Coleoptera
- Suborder: Polyphaga
- Infraorder: Scarabaeiformia
- Family: Scarabaeidae
- Genus: Amblymelanoplia
- Species: A. soetwaterensis

Binomial name
- Amblymelanoplia soetwaterensis Dombrow, 2022

Species of beetle

Amblymelanoplia soetwaterensis is a species of beetle of the family Scarabaeidae. It is found in South Africa (Northern Cape). The habitat consists of Tanqua Karoo.

== Description ==
Adults reach a length of about 9.5 mm. They are dull black. The head and clypeus have brown setae and the pronotum also has rown setae, but also a few elliptic white scales, a band of white scales along the lateral margin and some black setae on the lateral margin. The elytra have brown setae, as well as white scales.

== Etymology ==
The species name refers to the type locality near Soetwater in the Northern Cape.
