= Amblymelanoplia lainsburgensis =

Scientific classification
- Kingdom: Animalia
- Phylum: Arthropoda
- Class: Insecta
- Order: Coleoptera
- Suborder: Polyphaga
- Infraorder: Scarabaeiformia
- Family: Scarabaeidae
- Genus: Amblymelanoplia
- Species: A. lainsburgensis

Binomial name
- Amblymelanoplia lainsburgensis Dombrow, 2022

Species of beetle

Amblymelanoplia lainsburgensis is a species of beetle of the family Scarabaeidae. It is found in South Africa (Western Cape). The habitat consists of Koedoesberge-Moordenaars Karoo.

== Description ==
Adults reach a length of about 11.8 mm (0.46 in). They are mostly dull black. The clypeus and the head have black setae. The pronotum has pale-brown and brown setae, a stripe of white scales along the posterior margin and black setae on the lateral and anterior margins. The elytra have brown setae and some white scales at the anterior margin.

== Life history ==
The recorded host plant is Berkheya glabrata.

== Etymology ==
The species name refers to the locality of capture, near the town Laingsburg.
