= Amblymelanoplia sainvali =

Scientific classification
- Kingdom: Animalia
- Phylum: Arthropoda
- Class: Insecta
- Order: Coleoptera
- Suborder: Polyphaga
- Infraorder: Scarabaeiformia
- Family: Scarabaeidae
- Genus: Amblymelanoplia
- Species: A. sainvali

Binomial name
- Amblymelanoplia sainvali Dombrow, 2022

Species of beetle

Amblymelanoplia sainvali is a species of beetle of the family Scarabaeidae. It is found in South Africa (Western Cape). The habitat consists of Citrusdal Vygieveld.

== Description ==
Adults reach a length of about 9 mm. They are dull black. The head and clypeus have black setae and the pronotum has brown setae and black setae on lateral and anterior margins. The elytra have brown setae.

== Etymology ==
The species is dedicated to Mr Neef de Sainval, who collected this species.
