= Amblymelanoplia gydoensis =

Scientific classification
- Kingdom: Animalia
- Phylum: Arthropoda
- Class: Insecta
- Order: Coleoptera
- Suborder: Polyphaga
- Infraorder: Scarabaeiformia
- Family: Scarabaeidae
- Genus: Amblymelanoplia
- Species: A. gydoensis

Binomial name
- Amblymelanoplia gydoensis Dombrow, 2022

Species of beetle

Amblymelanoplia gydoensis is a species of beetle of the family Scarabaeidae. It is found in South Africa (Western Cape). The habitat consists of Winterhoek Sandstone Fynbos.

== Description ==
Adults reach a length of about 10 mm (0.39 in). They are mostly dull black. The clypeus and the head have black setae. The pronotum has pale-brown setae, some white scales at the posterior margin and brown setae on the lateral and anterior margins. The elytra have pale-brown setae, as well as black setae and some white scales at the anterior margin.

== Etymology ==
The species name is refers to the place of capture, the Gydo Mountains.
