= Amblymelanoplia vansoni =

Scientific classification
- Kingdom: Animalia
- Phylum: Arthropoda
- Class: Insecta
- Order: Coleoptera
- Suborder: Polyphaga
- Infraorder: Scarabaeiformia
- Family: Scarabaeidae
- Genus: Amblymelanoplia
- Species: A. vansoni

Binomial name
- Amblymelanoplia vansoni Dombrow, 2022

Species of beetle

Amblymelanoplia vansoni is a species of beetle of the family Scarabaeidae. It is found in South Africa (Western Cape). The habitat consists of Breede Alluvium Renosterveld.

== Description ==
Adults reach a length of about 10.1 mm. They are mostly dull black. The clypeus and head have brown setae, while the pronotum has pale-brown setae and black setae on the anterior and lateral margins. The elytra have pale-brown and brown setae.

== Etymology ==
The species is dedicated to the entomologist Dr. George van Son.
