= Amblymelanoplia brinckmanni =

Scientific classification
- Kingdom: Animalia
- Phylum: Arthropoda
- Class: Insecta
- Order: Coleoptera
- Suborder: Polyphaga
- Infraorder: Scarabaeiformia
- Family: Scarabaeidae
- Genus: Amblymelanoplia
- Species: A. brinckmanni

Binomial name
- Amblymelanoplia brinckmanni Dombrow, 2022

Species of beetle

Amblymelanoplia brinckmanni is a species of beetle of the family Scarabaeidae. It is found in South Africa (Western Cape). The habitat consists of Bokkeveld Sandstone Fynbos.

== Description ==
Adults reach a length of about 10.9–11.5 mm (0.43–0.45 in). They are dull black. The clypeus has brown setae, while the setae on the head are black. The pronotum has brown and dark brown setae of various lengths. The elytra have short, brown setae and a few white scales.

== Etymology ==
The species is dedicated to Mr. Jonathan Brinckmann, who collected the species.
