= Amblymelanoplia caliginosa =

Scientific classification
- Kingdom: Animalia
- Phylum: Arthropoda
- Class: Insecta
- Order: Coleoptera
- Suborder: Polyphaga
- Infraorder: Scarabaeiformia
- Family: Scarabaeidae
- Genus: Amblymelanoplia
- Species: A. caliginosa

Binomial name
- Amblymelanoplia caliginosa Dombrow, 2022

Species of beetle

Amblymelanoplia caliginosa is a species of beetle of the family Scarabaeidae. It is found in South Africa (Western Cape).

== Description ==
Adults reach a length of about 9.2 mm. They are dark red-brown, with the head, pronotum and scutellum dull black. The clypeus has pale-brown setae, while the setae on the head are black. The pronotum has pale-brown setae, mixed with brown setae. The elytra have pale-brown and brown setae.

== Etymology ==
The species name is derived from Latin caligin (meaning dark) and refers to the black colour of the pronotum.
