= Amblymelanoplia reichei =

Scientific classification
- Kingdom: Animalia
- Phylum: Arthropoda
- Class: Insecta
- Order: Coleoptera
- Suborder: Polyphaga
- Infraorder: Scarabaeiformia
- Family: Scarabaeidae
- Genus: Amblymelanoplia
- Species: A. reichei

Binomial name
- Amblymelanoplia reichei Dombrow, 2022

Species of beetle

Amblymelanoplia reichei is a species of beetle of the family Scarabaeidae. It is found in South Africa (Western Cape).

== Description ==
Adults reach a length of about 9 mm. They are dull black. The clypeus and head have black setae. The pronotum has brown setae and black setae on the anterior and lateral margins. The elytra have brown setae.

== Etymology ==
The species is dedicated to the famous collector of insects Louis Jérôme Reiche.
