= Amblymelanoplia swellendamensis =

Scientific classification
- Kingdom: Animalia
- Phylum: Arthropoda
- Class: Insecta
- Order: Coleoptera
- Suborder: Polyphaga
- Infraorder: Scarabaeiformia
- Family: Scarabaeidae
- Genus: Amblymelanoplia
- Species: A. swellendamensis

Binomial name
- Amblymelanoplia swellendamensis Dombrow, 2022

Species of beetle

Amblymelanoplia swellendamensis is a species of beetle of the family Scarabaeidae. It is found in South Africa (Western Cape). The habitat consists of South Langeberg Sandstone Fynbos.

== Description ==
Adults reach a length of about 11.5 mm (0.45 in). They are mostly dull black, with the legs blackish red-brown. The clypeus and the head have brown setae. The pronotum has pale-brown setae and some white scales, as well as red-brown setae on the lateral and anterior margins. The elytra have pale-brown and brown setae, as well as some white scales at the anterior margin.

== Etymology ==
The species name refers to the Swellendam district in the Western Cape.
