= Mihi itch =

Desire to define new species

Mihi itch or Mihisucht is the ambition to describe new species (or other taxa: subspecies, hybrids, genera, etc.) as a means to immortalize one's name. Mihi is the dative form of the Latin word ego, thus "mihi itch" means to satisfy one's egotistical impulses. The expression appeared in print as early as 1884.

A consequence of the Mihi itch may be the unwarranted description of new taxa, differing only slightly from already established taxa, leading to taxonomic inflation. A more extreme case may be termed taxonomic vandalism when a large number of species are described with limited scientific evidence.

== Examples ==
- La "nouvelle école" in malacology, led by Jules René Bourguignat, was responsible for the description of hundreds of new species of molluscs in Europe at the end of the nineteen century.
- Harold St. John published 440 names in the genus Pandanus, which encompasses c. 600 accepted species, and 283 names in the genus Cyrtandra, which encompasses c. 700 accepted species.
- Between 2000 and 2011, Raymond Hoser published 582 species names, and 340 generic names of animals (mostly reptiles).

== See also ==
- Taxonomic vandalism
- Taxonomic inflation
