= Amblymelanoplia costata =

Scientific classification
- Kingdom: Animalia
- Phylum: Arthropoda
- Class: Insecta
- Order: Coleoptera
- Suborder: Polyphaga
- Infraorder: Scarabaeiformia
- Family: Scarabaeidae
- Genus: Amblymelanoplia
- Species: A. costata

Binomial name
- Amblymelanoplia costata Dombrow, 2022

Species of beetle

Amblymelanoplia costata is a species of beetle of the family Scarabaeidae. It is found in South Africa (Western Cape). The habitat consists of Peninsula Shale Renosterveld.

== Description ==
Adults reach a length of about 11.3–11.6 mm (0.44–0.46 in). They are mostly dull black. The clypeus and the head have black setae. The pronotum has pale-brown setae, some white scales at the posterior margins and black setae on the lateral and anterior margins. The elytra have pale-brown and black setae, as well as some white scales at the anterior margin.

== Life history ==
The recorded host plant is Berkheya armata.

== Etymology ==
The species name is derived from Latin costa (meaning ridge) and refers to the longitudinal costae on the elytra.
