= Amblymelanoplia unidentata =

Scientific classification
- Kingdom: Animalia
- Phylum: Arthropoda
- Clade: Pancrustacea
- Class: Insecta
- Order: Coleoptera
- Suborder: Polyphaga
- Infraorder: Scarabaeiformia
- Family: Scarabaeidae
- Genus: Amblymelanoplia
- Species: A. unidentata

Binomial name
- Amblymelanoplia unidentata Dombrow, 2022

Species of beetle

Amblymelanoplia unidentata is a species of beetle of the family Scarabaeidae. It is found in South Africa (Western Cape). The habitat consists of Boland Granite Fynbos.

== Description ==
Adults reach a length of about 9.2 mm (0.36 in). They are mostly dull black. The clypeus and head have black setae. The pronotum has brown setae and black setae on the lateral and anterior margins. The elytra have brown setae.

== Life history ==
The recorded host plant is Euryops tenuissimus.

== Etymology ==
The species name is derived from Latin uni (meaning one) and dentat (meaning a tooth) and refers to the distinct ventral tooth on the metathoracic tibia.
