= Ernst Gustav Kraatz =

German entomologist

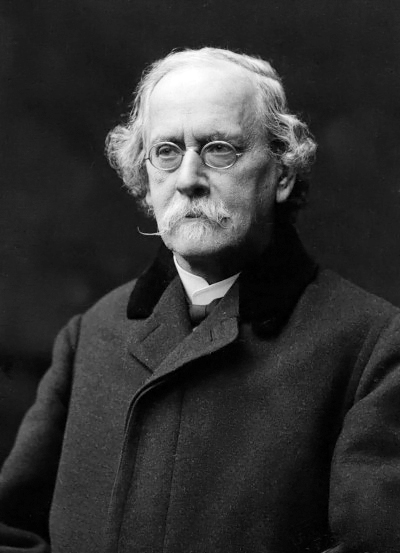
Ernst Gustav Kraatz (1831-1909)

Ernst Gustav Kraatz (13 March 1831 – 2 November 1909) was a German entomologist. He collected and described numerous beetles including Staphylinidae. Kraatz was a founding member of the Berlin Entomological Club (Berliner Entomologischer Verein) and the German entomological society (Deutsche Entomologische Gesellschaft) and the first editor of its journal, the Deutsche Entomologische Zeitschrift. Kraatz was involved in improving the standards of taxonomic description in German entomology and he was a proponent of a national collection that allowed public access to specimens.

== Life and work ==
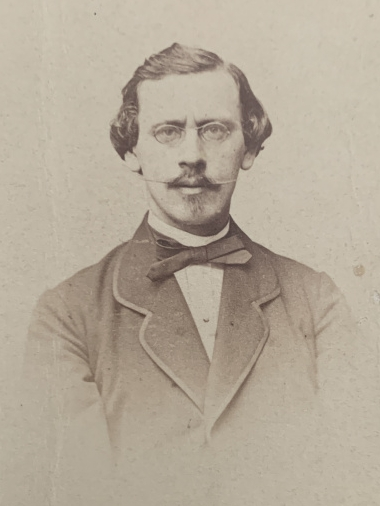
Kraatz in 1872

Kraatz was born in Berlin on 13 March 1831. He studied law in the University of Heidelberg and at the University of Bonn but found no interest in it. When he was just fifteen years old he had sent 250 staphylinids to Ernst August Hellmuth von Kiesenwetter (1820–1880). Through the influence of his father's friend Carl August Dohrn he shifted to study entomology at the University of Berlin. He published his first paper on myrmecophily in the Stettiner Entomologische Zeitung in 1849. He attended courses in law from 1850 to 1853 at Berlin, Bonn and Heidelberg. While at Heidelberg he had a duel with a Spanish aristocrat named Da Silva. In 1854 he returned to Berlin and studied under H. M. Lichtenstein (1780––1857), C. G. Ehrenberg (1795––1876), W. Peters (1815––1883), and J. P. Müller (1801––1858). His PhD was on "Genera Aleocharionorum" (Staphylinidae) and his defense was in Jena in 1856. He travelled and networked extensively with entomologists across Europe. He also collected entomological works from antiquarians. He was a key founder of the Berliner Entomologischer Verein in 1856 and served as its first chairman. He had already been a member of the Stettiner Entomologischer Verein, Société entomologique de France and the Wiener zoologisch-botanische Gesellschaft. Kraatz took on the editorship of the journal of the club, the Berliner Entomologische Zeitschrift (later renamed to the Deutsche Entomologische Zeitschrift). In the 1870s there was a plan to create a new national entomological collection. Kraatz was critical of the Kustodenherrlichkeit or the high-handedness of curators who made access to collections difficult. When the collections of F.H. Loew (d. 1878) were incorporated into the zoological museum, Kraatz argued for its separation and this split the Berlin Entomological Club and Kraatz then founded the Deutsche Entomologische Gesellschaft (DEG) and many of the coleopterists shifted their camp. It was only after Kraatz's death that the two societies were able to reunite. Kraatz was also critical of evolutionary theory as well as taxonomic vanity. Writing on the work of Viktor Ivanovitch Motschulsky (with whom he had a running feud) he made use of the term Mihisucht in 1862 which was later translated as the mihi itch. Kraatz worked on the beetle fauna of the whole world using the vast collections in the Natural History Museum of Berlin and described numerous species. The German entomological collection that he dreamt of was finally achieved in 1904. In 1905 the Prussian government gave him the title of professor. Loss of eyesight led to stoppage of work and he died in Berlin. His collection is held by Deutsches Entomologisches Institut. His last years were lonely and he wished that his ashes were kept among his collections of staphylinids.

Kraatz's major publications include:

- Kraatz, G. (1856-1857) Naturgeschichte der Insecten Deutschlands. Abt. 1. Coleoptera. Zweiter Band. Berlin: Verlag der Nicolaischen Buchhandlung, viii+1080 pp.
- Kraatz, G. (1859) Die Staphylinen-Fauna von Ostindien, inbesondere der Insel Ceylan. Archiv für Naturgeschichte, 25(1):1-193.
- Kraatz, G. (1879) Neue Käfer vom Amur. Deutsche Entomologische Zeitschrift, 23:121-144.
