= Paleobiota of the La Brea Tar Pits =

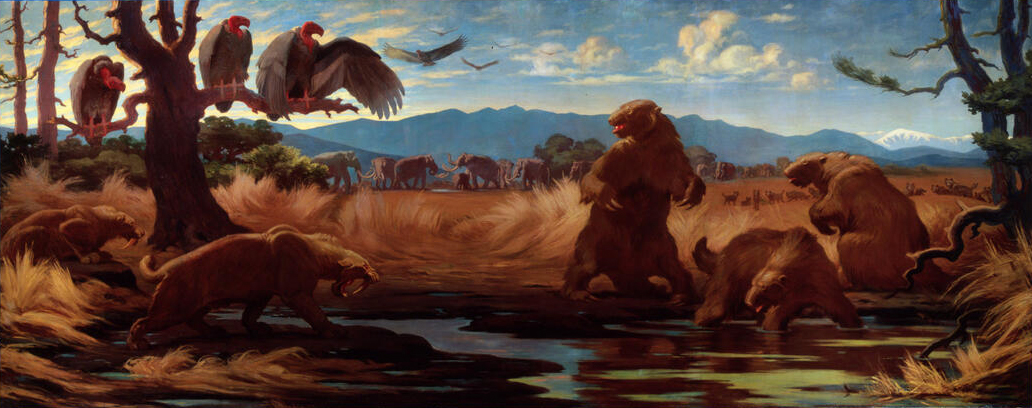
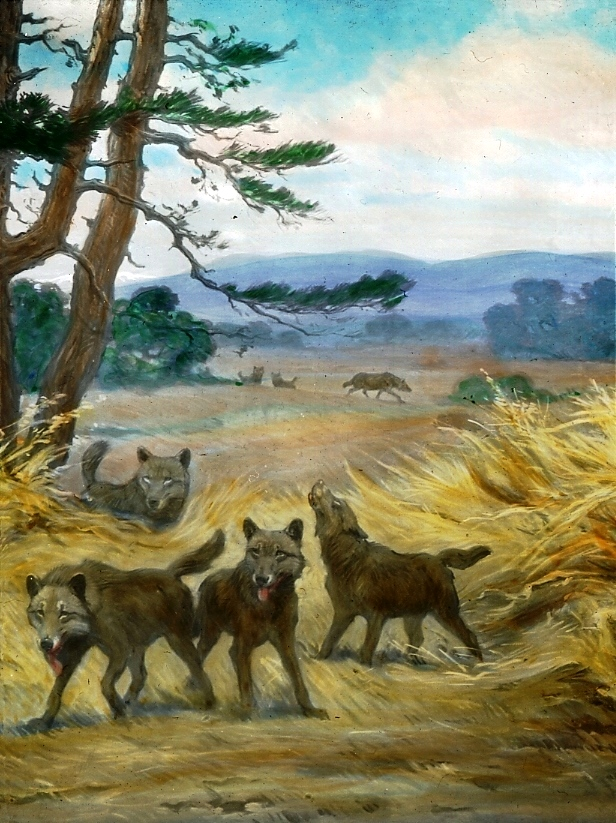
La Brea Tar Pits fauna as depicted by Charles R. Knight

A list of prehistoric and extant species whose fossils have been found in the La Brea Tar Pits, located in present-day Hancock Park, a city park on the Miracle Mile section of the Mid-Wilshire district in Los Angeles, California.

Some of the tar pit's fossils are displayed in the adjacent George C. Page Museum of La Brea Discoveries in the park. They are primarily from Pleistocene predator species. Daggers (†) in the list denote extinct species.

== Mammals ==
=== Artiodactyla ===
Common name	Species	Material	Notes	Image
† Western camel	† Camelops hesternus	at least 36 individuals.	A large species of camel characterized by a generalized browsing diet. Alongside the ancient bison and western horse, it was among the most abundant large herbivores recovered from the tar pits.	framless
† Ancient bison	† Bos antiquus	At least 300 individuals.	A large migratory species of bison, possibly ancestral to the modern American bison through the intermediate species Bison occidentalis. It is the most abundant large herbivore found at La Brea.	
† Dwarf pronghorn	† Capromeryx minor	Hundreds of specimens.	A diminutive pronghorn less than half the size of the modern species. Due to the decreased weight and size, Capromeryx was generally more slender than other pronghorns. It further differs through its conical, non-branching horns. Although most of the skeleton was known by 1914, it wouldn't be until over a hundred years later that the postcranial bones would be described in detail.	
† Flat-headed Peccary	† Platygonus compressus	A fragmentary skull and limb bones	A widespread species of peccary known to have inhabited grassland and arid regions. Compared to other species of its genus, Platygonus compressus was better adapted at feeding on grasses.	
† Giant bison	† Bos latifrons		One of the largest known ruminants, the long-horned bison is thought to be the direct ancestor to the ancient bison. Bison latifrons differs from the other La Brea species in size and the dimensions of the horns.	
Cf. Mule deer	Odocoileus cf. hemionus		Deer remains that were tentatively assigned to the modern mule deer by several authors. However, in Balassa et al. 2022 these remains are assigned to the white-tailed deer instead.	
Pronghorn	Antilocapra americana		An extant relative of the dwarf pronghorn Capromeryx, this species is notably larger and features characteristic two-pronged horns. The La Brea material is indistinguishable from the modern form.	
Cf. Wapiti	Cervus cf. canadensis		Although present at the tar pits, material assigned to the modern elk has not been dated. This leaves it ambiguous whether or not it coexisted with some of the well known La Brea animals such as the short-faced bear and American lion.	
† Shrub-ox	† Euceratherium cf. collinum		An extinct relative of the modern muskox. Findings from Colorado suggest that it was a browser that fed on trees and shrubs.	
† Large-headed llama	† Hemiauchenia macrocephala	Isolated Limb Bones	A species of llama with an opportunistic generalized diet.	

=== Carnivora ===
Common name	Species	Material	Notes	Image
American badger	Taxidea taxus		Badger fossils account for approximately 0.39% of the total carnivoran fauna at Rancho La Brea. One possibility is that some badgers were trapped when tar seeped into their burrows.	
American black bear	Ursus americanus		Among the black bear remains recovered from La Brea is the skull of a juvenile individual. Black bears inhabiting the region during this period were larger than their modern descendants, although the species is comparatively underrepresented in the La Brea fossil record. This scarcity may be related to its omnivorous diet, potentially indicating that predator abundance at the site was influenced in part by scavenging behavior.	
† American cheetah	Miracinonyx trumani	Isolated remains	A 2022 study proposed that several isolated remains, including a humerus, radius, femur and the holotype mandible of Felis daggetti, which had previously been attributed to the modern cougar, are instead referable to Miracinonyx trumani.	
† American lion	† Panthera atrox	At least 80 individuals	A large pantherine, the American lion is thought to have descended from Eurasian cave lions that became isolated in North America. It is considerably less common than the contemporary Smilodon. Within the species, fossil remains are believed to represent males more frequently than females.	
Bobcat	Lynx rufus		Bobcats are rare compared to other cats at La Brea. Van Valkenburgh suggests that they may have lived at the fringe of the predator community.	
Cougar	Puma concolor		Isotopic analysis suggests that cougars, as well as other large cats at La Brea, preferred to hunt prey living in more closed environments. Cougars were found to be more generalized in diet than contemporary cats such as Smilodon or the American lion, which could be the reason why they survived into modern days.	
† Dire wolf	† Aenocyon dirus	Over 4,000 individuals	A large wolf-like carnivore, the dire wolf was the most common predator found in the tar pits of La Brea, outnumbering the slightly smaller grey wolf over 100-fold. They could reach a weight of approximately 68 kg (150 lb). Despite the name this animal is not a wolf but instead part of its own genus distinct from Canis that evolved independently from modern wolves.	framless
Domestic dog	Canis familiaris	Several individuals	The dogs from La Brea include a small dog similar to the Techichi breed. Despite being found close to the human remains known as the La Brea Woman, the dog remains proved to be approximately 7.000 years younger. This means that there is no connection between the dog and human remains of La Brea. Another larger individual was initially thought to be a distinct species.	
Furlong's wolf	Canis lupus furlongi		Modern wolves are notably rarer at La Brea than the slightly larger dire wolves. One particular fossil preserves the femur of a wolf that survived a traumatic injury. The nature of the fossil suggests that the wolf's leg was either broken and developed a pseudarthrosis or that the leg was entirely amputated and healed. Such an injury could have been inflicted by the numerous larger predators such as bears, big cats or dire wolves.	
† Giant jaguar	† Panthera onca augusta	At least five individuals represented by 20 specimens, which include a palette, vertebrae, ribs and limb bones	A giant subspecies of the modern jaguar. The material ranges in age from 11,600 years to 28,000 years old.	
† Giant short-faced bear	† Arctodus simus	At least 30 individuals	Arctodus was one of the largest known carnivorans in history and belonged to the Tremarctinae, a subfamily of bears endemic to the Americas. Studies suggest that much like many modern bears, Arctodus was an omnivore with no direct adaptations for either hypercarnivory or scavenging as previously believed. This bear reached an average weight of 600 kg (1,300 lb).	framless
Gray fox	Urocyon cinereoargenteus		Remains of gray foxes make up 0.48% of the La Brea predator fauna. A baculum from the pits suggests that these foxes were smaller in the past.	
Grizzly bear	Ursus arctos horribilis		A complete grizzly bear skull was found in Pit 10, which also yielded human remains. Carbon dating confirms that the Californian grizzly only appeared in La Brea after the extinction of the larger short-faced bear.	
Long-tailed weasel	Neogale frenata	53 skulls	Isotopic analysis indicates that at La Brea the long-tailed weasel fed on ground squirrels and cottontail rabbits. It is the most common mustelid at La Brea.	
† Pleistocene coyote	† Canis latrans orcutti		Fossils from La Brea show that Pleistocene coyotes were larger and more robust than their modern relatives and actively hunted larger prey. However, Holocene coyote fossils from Pit 10 already show a decrease in size and change in the anatomy of the mandible, indicating that by this point in time coyotes had begun adapting towards conditions more similar to today. This includes changing their diet from large prey to smaller animals such as rabbits. They are the third most common predator found in the tar pits, only behind the dire wolf and Smilodon.	
Raccoon	Procyon lotor	A single specimen	Raccoons and the related ringtail may be rare due to their nocturnal habits, which would mean they are active when the tar is cool and more solid.	
Ringtail	Bassariscus astutus	A single specimen		
† Saber-toothed cat	† Smilodon fatalis	Over 2,000 individuals represented by more than 130,000 specimens.	Smilodon is among the most well-known mammals from Rancho La Brea and the second most common carnivore found in the pits, only behind the dire wolf. Unlike the American lion, which is a true cat, Smilodon was a member of the Machairodontinae. Based on the microwear texture of the teeth it has been suggested that Smilodon fed on both harder material and soft flesh, preferring the latter following injuries to the jaws and teeth.	
† Scimitar-toothed cat	† Homotherium serum	Canine teeth and metapodials	Relative to the related Smilodon, Homotherium was much rarer at La Brea. Ecologically it was a more cursorial hunter preferring open environments and predominantly feeding on grazers. Among the prey known to have been taken by Homotherium are juvenile mammoths.	
Striped skunk	Mephitis mephitis		Approximately 0.96% of the La Brea carnivore fauna is made up of striped skunks.	
Western spotted skunk	Spilogale gracilis		Fossils of the spotted skunk are rarer than those of striped skunks. They only account for 0.18% of La Brea's carnivoran fauna.	

=== Chiroptera ===
Common name	Species	Material	Notes	Image
Hoary bat	Lasiurus cinereus		Remains of the hoary bat were discovered in Pit 91.	
Pallid bat	Antrozous pallidus		Pallid bats might have become entrapped in tar due to their habit of feeding on insects near the ground.	

=== Lagomorpha ===
Common name	Species	Material	Notes	Image
Black-tailed jackrabbit	Lepus californicus		This species appears to only occur in deposits from the Last Glacial Maximum onward and is absent in those predating it. This could be indicative of environmental changes occurring at La Brea in this time period.	
Brush rabbit	Sylvilagus bachmani		The brush rabbit is more commonly found in the older La Brea deposits. This might be because the species requires denser vegetation and was faced with increased aridification and more open environments that favored jackrabbits and desert cottontails.	
Desert cottontail	Sylvilagus audubonii		Excluding juvenile remains, desert cottontail fossils from La Brea suggest that the species was smaller than modern individuals	

=== Perissodactyla ===
Common name	Species	Material	Notes	Image
† California tapir	† Tapirus californicus	One jaw with teeth and two phalanges	A small species of tapir known from few remains at La Brea. The taxonomic status of many North American tapirs is debated and many of the species may be synonyms of each other.	
† Mexican horse	† Equus conversidens		A small bodied horse species of dubious nature, only few remains are known from La Brea. Some researchers have argued that the Mexican horse is a synonym of Haringtonhippus or that the name is a nomen dubium.	
† Western horse	† Equus occidentalis	Over 200 individuals	One of the most common herbivores found in the tar pits, its teeth are more complex than that of modern horses. Due to this the western horse has been interpreted to have filled a different dietary niche than horses today, possibly being a mixed feeder consuming a not insignificant amount of wooden browse from shrubs and other plants.	

=== Primates ===
Common name	Species	Material	Notes	Image
Human	Homo sapiens	A skull and partial skeleton commonly known as the La Brea Woman.	The remains of a woman between 18 and 24 years old who died of a fractured skull. This skeleton represents the only known human remains from the tar pits. She was found alongside a grinding stone and may have been buried in the tar.	framless

=== Proboscidea ===
Common name	Species	Material	Notes	Image
† Columbian mammoth	† Mammuthus columbi	At least 36 individuals.	A large species of mammoth. The largest individual found at La Brea, nicknamed Zed, was unearthed in 2006 and has tusks 3.16 m (10.4 ft) long (measured along their outer curve). Zed is also the most complete mammoth found in the tar pits, preserving 80% of the bones.	
† Pacific mastodon	† Mammut pacificus	11 specimens.	The Pacific mastodon is endemic to the western United States including California and Idaho. This species differs from the American mastodon by having narrower teeth and lacking mandibular tusks. Additionally, this species has 6 instead of 5 neck vertebrae and a more robust femur.	

=== Rodentia ===
Common name	Species	Material	Notes	Image
Agile kangaroo rat	Dipodomys agilis		A relatively common rodent.	
Botta's pocket gopher	Thomomys bottae		Gopher skulls are said to be abundant from La Brea. Joseph Grinnell describes these skulls to be identical to those of modern Botta's pocket gophers, which still inhabit California today.	
California ground squirrel	Otospermophilus beecheyi			
California pocket mouse	Perognathus californicus		A relatively abundant species.	
California vole	Microtus californicus			
Dusky-footed woodrat ?	Neotoma fuscipes ?		Hundreds, possibly thousands of fossil fecal pellets (coprolites) are known from La Brea and assigned to Neotoma in addition to fossil bones. While the bones have historically been identified as Neotoma fuscipes, taxonomic revisions have cast doubt on the assignment. Today Neotoma lepida and Neotoma macrotis are still found in the area, the later of which was formerly considered to be a subspecies of Neotoma fuscipes. The La Brea fossils could subsequently represent one of these two species, a southern population of N. fuscipes or even a hybrid.	
† Imperfect mouse	† Peromyscus imperfectus		The only extinct rodent from La Brea. This species may be ancestral to the deer mice of the south Californian islands.	
Merriam's chipmunk	Neotamias cf. merriami			
Southern grasshopper mouse	Onychomys torridus			
Western harvest mouse	Reithrodontomys megalotis			

=== Soricomorpha ===
Common name	Species	Material	Notes	Image
Broad-footed mole	Scapanus sp.	A single right humerus	The remains of the broad-footed mole have been found at Pit 91.	
Crawford's gray shrew	Notiosorex crawfordi		This species is notably more common in the tar pits than the ornate shrew, outnumbering the later 10:1.	
Ornate shrew	Sorex ornatus	A few bones	The ornate shrew is still found at La Brea today.	

=== Xenarthra ===
Common name	Species	Material	Notes	Image
† Harlan's ground sloth	† Paramylodon harlani	Over 70 individuals with at least 30 preserved skulls.	The largest and most common of the La Brea sloths. Harlan's ground sloth is considered to be a "grazing sloth" with large portions of its diet being composed of grasses. Coltrain and colleagues however argue that it was more of a mixed feeder regardless of the dental anatomy.	framless
† Jefferson's ground sloth	† Megalonyx jeffersonii		Megalonyx appears to be the rarest of the three La Brea ground sloths. Although more closely related to Nothrotheriops, it approached Paramylodon in size. It was a browsing animal preferring woodland and forest.	
† Shasta ground sloth	† Nothrotheriops shastensis		A solitary ground sloth species roughly the size of a bear. Unlike Paramylodon it was a browser that may have only occasionally come into proximity of the tar pits, preferring more arid regions adjacent to La Brea.	

== Birds ==
=== Accipitriformes ===
Common name	Species	Material	Notes	Image
† American neophron	† Neophrontops americanus		A species of Old World vulture. Hertel proposed that Neophrontops americanus was likely a scrap-feeding scavenger, remaining at a distance while larger scavengers fed before consuming the remnants of their meals. This behavior is comparable to that observed in the modern Egyptian vulture.	Neophrontops americanus fossil
Bald eagle	Haliaeetus leucocephalus	At least 175 individuals.	Bald eagles are among some of the most common fossil birds recovered from the tar pits. Despite the variation in body size observed in modern populations in accordance with Bergmann's rule, the La Brea bald eagles show no evidence of a significant change in body size during the Last Glacial Maximum. This pattern is consistent with that observed in several other birds of prey found in La Brea.	
White-tailed kite	Elanus leucurus	A single specimen		
† Fragile eagle	† Buteogallus fragilis	At least 83 individuals	A slender-legged bird of prey with proportions resembling those of the common black hawk.	
Cooper's hawk	Astur cooperii	52 specimen (Note: It is unclear in Zink et al. (2020) whether or not "specimen" refers to the total amount of fossil material or the minimum amount of individual animals that can be extrapolated from the material. The paper contains data that seems to correspond to the former sometimes and the later at other points.)		
† Daggett's eagle	† Buteogallus daggetti	Only few fossils, primarily of the legs.	Also known as the "walking eagle", B. daggetti was a species of long-legged hawk related to, but considerably larger than the modern savanna hawk. Its unusually elongated leg bones have led to comparisons with the secretary bird of Africa. It is estimated to have had a wingspan of 169–196 cm (67–77 in) and a body mass of approximately 3 kilograms (6.6 lb).	
† Errant eagle	† Neogyps errans		In spite of being considered a gypaetine vulture, Neogyps errans is thought to have been more eagle-like in appearance with leg bones somewhat similar to the bearded vulture. Hertel predicted Neogyps to have been a ripper scavenger, meaning it would have been one of the first vultures at a carcass, ripping it open and feeding on tougher elements like the hide.	
Ferruginous hawk	Buteo regalis	At least 127 individuals.		
Golden eagle	Aquila chrysaetos	A minimum of 960 individuals.	The most common bird species found in the La Brea tar pits.	
† Grinnell's hawk-eagle	† Spizaetus grinnelli	At least 105 individuals.	A species of hawk-eagle, remains of Spizaetus grinnelli are also known from Florida.	
Hawk	Buteo sp.		A group of individuals similar in proportion to the red-shouldered hawk.	
Northern harrier	Circus hudsonius	A minimum of 164 individuals.		
American goshawk	Astur gentilis	At least two specimen		
Red-tailed hawk	Buteo jamaicensis	A minimum of 108 individuals.		
Rough-legged hawk	Buteo lagopus	Two tarsometatarsi and a femur		
Sharp-shinned hawk	Accipiter striatus velox	Five specimen		
Swainson's hawk	Buteo swainsoni	At least 130 individuals	A species of hawk that primarily feeds on insects. Unlike other bird species found at La brea, which are typically larger than their modern counterparts, the Swainson's hawk appears to have undergone a size increase. Modern individuals are more robust than those found in the tar pits.	
† Woodward's eagle	Buteogallus woodwardi		B. woodwardi was previously regarded as a species of Amplibuteo before taxonomic revisions.	

=== Anseriformes ===
Common name	Species	Material	Notes	Image
Cf. Brant goose	Branta cf. bernicla			
Canada goose	Branta canadensis			
Canvasback	Aythya valisineria			
Cinnamon teal	Spatula cyanoptera			
Green-winged teal	Anas carolinensis	Multiple specimens	One of the first duck species recorded at La Brea. This species is well recorded in both the academy and museum pits.	
Gadwall	Mareca strepera			
† Graceful pygmy goose	† Anabernicula gracilenta	At least 150 specimen representing 23 to 24 individuals	An extinct species of shellduck. The average pygmy goose from La Brea was found to be smaller than those from the McKittrick tar pits.	
Greater white-fronted goose	Anser albifrons	Several tarsometatarsi and femora	According to Howard, the La Brea material includes sizes that fall within the range of both modern subspecies.	
Mallard	Anas platyrhynchos	Multiple specimens	Mallards are well represented in both the academy and museum pits. Mallards were among the first ducks identified at La Brea.	
Northern shoveler?	Spatula clypeata?	Multiple specimens including fused carpal phalanges	Remains are of similar size as those of modern shovelers.	
Ross's goose?	Anser rossi?	Several tarsometatarsi	Skeletal elements of this species are assigned to it on the basis of their lesser size compared to the snow goose. However this is deemed to be tentative as the difference could also be explained by intraspecific size variation.	
Snow goose	Anser caerulescens	Femora and tarsometatarsi	According to Hildegarde Howard, snow goose material from La Brea indicates that this species attained larger sizes during the Pleistocene than today.	
Tundra swan	Cygnus columbianus	A carpometacarpus, femur and possible tarsometatarsus		

=== Caprimulgiformes ===
Common name	Species	Material	Notes	Image
Common poorwill	Phalaenoptilus nuttallii	Seven specimens		

=== Cathartiformes ===
Common name	Species	Material	Notes	Image
	† Cathartornis gracilis	2 tarsometatarsi	A poorly known teratorn only known from two bones. Although additional material has been considered to be referable to it, said fossils remain undescribed.	
	† Gymnogyps amplus		A species of condor larger and more robust than the modern Californian condor. It is possible that this species gave rise to the modern form some time during the early Holocene, however due to the timing of this size decrease it is thought that the changes were not a direct response to the extinction of the Pleistocene megafauna.	
† La Brea black vulture	† Coragyps occidentalis		A species of black vulture also known as the Pleistocene black vulture. Although initially thought to be ancestral to the modern form, later studies showed that instead they evolved from South American black vultures that specialised in colder high-altitude environments. Hertel classified the La Brea black vulture as a scrapper scavenger, more specialised in feeding on small scraps.	
† La Brea condor	Breagyps clarki		Hertel considers Breagyps to be a gulper in regards to scavenging style, though with the most deviating anatomy compared to the other contemporary gulp scavengers. This is due to the vulture's elongated and narrow beak. Fisher described Breagyps as a generalized vulture with a cranium similar to the two modern condor species and a beak reminiscent of the black vulture.	
† Merriam's teratorn	Teratornis merriami	Over 100 individuals	A large bodied teratorn with a wingspan between 3.5–3.8 m (11–12 ft). Despite being commonly depicted as vulture-like scavengers, the cranial anatomy of teratorns indicates that they were active predators built to swallow prey whole. Consequently, Merriam's teratorn would have likely preyed on animals such as frogs, lizards, small birds and rodents.	Teratornis skeleton
Turkey vulture	Cathartes aura	34 specimen	Although turkey vultures found in La Brea are considered to be part of the same species as modern populations, the fossils indicate that they were slightly larger. Additionally, this Pleistocene form was more adapted towards feeding on larger chunks of carrion compared to the more recent representatives of the species.	

=== Ciconiiformes ===
Common name	Species	Material	Notes	Image
† Asphalt stork	Ciconia maltha		A widespread species of stork with great intraspecific variation. The asphalt stork was described based on material from La Brea, but has since then found in multiple other localities across the United States. Individual asphalt storks could have reached a height of 1.5 m (4 ft 11 in) and a wingspan of 3 m (9.8 ft).	
	†Mycteria wetmorei	A mandible and the end of a tarsometatarsus.	An extinct relative of the modern wood stork, Mycteria wetmorei was larger than the extant species and had a straighter mandible that was more similar to that seen in the African and Asian species.	

=== Charadriiformes ===
Common name	Species	Material	Notes	Image
American avocet	Recurvirostra americana	Five specimens		
† La Brea lapwing	† Belonopterus downsi	Right carpometacarpus and a partial humerus	An extinct species of lapwing most closely related to species from South America. Its size is intermediate between the southern lapwing and the Andean lapwing.	
Black-legged kittiwake?	Rissa tridactyla?	A coracoid	Possible remains of the black-legged kittiwake are known from La Brea. However the identification is not certain.	
Dunlin	Calidris alpina			
Greater yellowlegs	Tringa melanoleuca	Several specimen		
Black-bellied plover	Pluvialis squatarola	Several specimen		
Killdeer	Charadrius vociferus	A humerus and tarsometatarsus	Miller regarded the presence of killdeers at La Brea as unsurprising given the species' appearance in modern inland sloughs and meadows.	
Long-billed curlew	Numenius americanus	Right tarsometatarus and a left coracoid	The bones from La Brea show no difference from modern curlews.	
Marbled godwit?	Limosa fedoa?	Material of the tarsometatarsus and tibiotarsus	Fossil material assigned to the marbled godwit closely resembles material of modern specimens in shape and size. However, due to the incomplete nature of the material the assignment is considered to be only tentative by Howard.	
Red phalarope	Phalaropus fulicarius			
Sanderling	Calidris alba			
Short-billed dowitcher	Limnodromus griseus	A coracoid and an incomplete humerus	Miller regards the presence of dowitchers as less expected than that of killdeers, but argues that birds with similar habits are known to take breaks around small freshwater ponds. It could have been during one such break that a dowitcher may have gotten stuck in the asphalt.	
Short-billed gull?	Larus brachyrhynchus?	A humerus	A species of gull which at times was considered to be conspecific with the European common gull, causing it to be identified as Larus canus in some publications. The La Brea humerus may have belonged to this species on account of its size.	
Hudsonian whimbrel	Numenius hudsonicus			
Willet	Tringa semipalmata			
Wilson's snipe	Gallinago delicata			

=== Columbiformes ===
Common name	Species	Material	Notes	Image
Band-tailed pigeon	Patagioenas fasciata	At least three specimens belonging to a minimum of three individuals	Stock notes that band-tailed pigeons were relatively rare in the tar seeps of La Brea, which Howard argues may reflect the environmental conditions. This matches the fact that band-tailed pigeons prefer forest habitats, while Pleistocene La Brea is thought to have been more open.	
Mourning dove	Zenaida macroura	29 specimens belonging to a minimum of 17 individual birds	Mourning doves are considerably more common than the other pigeon species found in the asphalt seeps. This reflects the bird's preferred habitat, with the mourning dove frequenting more open areas than its two contemporaries.	
† Passenger pigeon	† Ectopistes migratorius	Six fossils belonging to at least three individuals	Although initially thought to have been an exclusively northern and eastern species, bones found in La Brea and New Mexico eventually showed that the passenger pigeon was found on both coasts during the Pleistocene. Although Howard argued that its abundance cannot be determined, its rarer nature matches that of the band-tailed pigeon which has a similar preference for forests.	

=== Cuculiformes ===
Common name	Species	Material	Notes	Image
Greater roadrunner	Geococcyx californianus	25 specimen	Due to the relatively mild winters of the region the La Brea population of the roadrunner shows no significant size difference towards their modern relatives, unlike Pleistocene populations that lived further inland.	

=== Falconiformes ===
Common name	Species	Material	Notes	Image
American kestrel	Falco sparverius	79 specimens		
Falcon	Falco sp.		An indetermined species of falcon.	
† La Brea caracara	† Caracara plancus prelutosus		It was initially established by Hildegarde Howard as a distinct species, Polyborus pelutosus, but this notion was later rejected by Storrs Olson. Olson considered both the northern and southern caracara to be nothing but subspecies and subsequently argued that the traits of the La Brea caracara would fall within the variation of this combined species. Regardless, the animal is still considered to be a valid temporal subspecies. Later revisions caused the genus name to be changed from Polyborus to Caracara.	
Merlin	Falco columbarius	16 specimen		
Peregrine falcon	Falco peregrinus	29 specimen		
Prairie falcon	Falco mexicanus	24 specimen		

=== Galliformes ===
Common name	Species	Material	Notes	Image
† Californian turkey	Meleagris californica	Over 11.000 fossil specimens belonging to almost 800 individual birds.	One of the most common birds at the La Brea tar pits, the Californian turkey is most closely related to the modern wild turkey, from which it likely evolved after a population became isolated in California. In size it was intermediate between the two modern turkey species.	
California quail	Callipepla californica	138 specimens		

=== Gruiformes ===
Common name	Species	Material	Notes	Image
American coot	Fulica americana	A tibiotarsus		
	† Grus pagei	At least 17 individuals based on 42 fossil bones	A gracile crane that was comparable in size to the smallest modern sandhill crane individuals, but notably smaller than members of the species found at La Brea. Besides size the two cranes differ in the anatomy of the skull, which is larger and more slender in Grus pagei.	
Sandhill crane	Antigone canadensis	417 fossils corresponding to at least 52 individuals	Sandhill crane fossils found in the tar pits indicate that individuals of this species grew to much larger sizes during the Pleistocene. The species Grus minor, described from the La Brea tar pits, was later found to be a synonym of the sandhill crane.	
Whooping crane	Grus americana	A minimum of 45 specimens representing at least 8 individuals	The largest but also rarest of the La Brea crane species. While Grus pagei and the sandhill crane were commonly found together, whooping cranes appear in less than half of the same pits as the other cranes.	

=== Strigiformes ===
Common name	Species	Material	Notes	Image
	Asio sp.	159 fossils of 46 individuals	Various owl remains found in La Brea are not diagnostic enough to be assigned to either of the two Asio species found in the pits. The material however shows no signs of belonging to a distinct third species.	
American barn owl	Tyto furcata	Almost 2.000 specimens amounting to at least 253 individuals.	The barn owl is among the most common owls found in the La Brea tar pits, second only to the burrowing owl. This matches with the barn owl's preference for open environments with scattered trees.	
† Brea miniature owl	† Asphaltoglaux cecileae	4 fossils of 3 individuals.	The rarest owl found in the pits, the lack of material might have various reasons. Its small size means that they may not have been caught in the asphalt as often as larger animals, additionally, older collections valued large animals over small ones. Fossils of Asphaltoglaux are found in the same pits as those of Kurochkin's pygmy owl, which could suggest that these particular pits were located in less open environments more suited to these small owl species. Asphaltoglaux is similar to and may be related with owls of the genus Aegolius.	
Burrowing owl	Athene cunicularia	Over 2.700 specimens belonging to almost 400 animals.	The most common owl of La Brea, burrowing owl fossils make up 35% of all owl fossils and 34% of all individuals. This abundance can at least partially be explained by the species' habitat preferences, as burrowing owls prefer open environments such as prairies, grasslands and deserts. This matches the environment of La Brea, which is generally considered to have been open with no proper forests. Being ground dwellers also means that these owls are more likely to come in contact with the asphalt seeps.	
Great horned owl	Bubo virginianus	1.280 fossils of at least 131 owls.	The great horned owl is the fourth most common owl species found at La Brea. It is known to inhabit a wide range of environments including more wooded areas, however according to Campbell and Bochenski the species prefers to forage in more open environments. Regardless, the authors note that the weight of this bird would work against it when getting stuck, meaning that although it may not come into contact with the tar as commonly the risk of being unable to move is increased.	
† Kurochkin's pygmy owl	† Glaucidium kurochkini	12 fossil specimens belonging to at least 6 individuals.	Although it is difficult to determine habitat preferences of the extinct La Brea owls, Campbell and Bochenski argue that they would likely be similar to those of extant Glaucidium species, which prefer woodlands over open landscape. This is further supported by the fact that it is found alongside Asphaltoglaux in the same pits, an owl that may have also preferred more forested areas. G. kurochkini was approximately the size of the modern mountain pygmy owl, which the fossils were assigned to before being recognized as a distinct species.	
† La Brea owl	† Oraristrix brea	144 fossil specimens belonging to at least 28 birds.	A large owl similar in size to the great grey owl and the great horned owl. Specimens of this owl are most commonly found in pits that also contain high numbers of the later species, indicating that they may have overlapped in prey preferences or hunting methods. It was a slender bird with longer limbs, which have been interpretet to correspond with more terrestrial habits, potentially living in coastal shrubland rather than forests.	
Long-eared owl	Asio otus	173 specimens accounting for at least 50 individuals.	Unlike the related short-eared owl, the long-eared owl is relatively more rare in the La Brea pits. This might be due to the species' preference for wooded areas, although it does not require closed canopy forests. Additionally, unlike many of the more common owls known from fossil material, the long-eared owl is much more strictly nocturnal. This means that the tar would be much cooler when this species hunts, decreasing the risk of getting stuck.	
Western screech owl	Megascops kennicottii	79 fossils of 22 birds.	The western screech owl is known to have similar habitat preferences and periods of activity as the long-eared owl.	
Short-eared owl	Asio flammeus	Close to 1.400 fossil specimens belonging to a minimum of 186 birds.	Much like the burrowing owl and barn owl, the short-eared owl shows a preference for open environments in its modern range, explaining why the species is so abundant in the La Brea tar pits. The fact that this owl is also more diurnal, like the burrowing owl, presents an additional risk as the asphalt is stickier during the warm days.	

=== Passeriformes ===
Common name	Species	Material	Notes	Image
American crow	Corvus brachyrhynchos	22 specimens		
American goldfinch	Spinus tristis	Three specimens including at least one upper and one lower mandible	Goldfinches may have inhabited the open fields and meadows of La Brea as well as the weedy borders of these habitats. They were resident birds during the Last Glacial Maximum, but are only present during the winter today.	
American robin	Turdus migratorius	18 specimens		
Bell's sparrow	Artemisiospiza belli	Seven mandibles	Material of the Bell's sparrow was reported alongside that of the black-throated sparrow by Sibley (1939).	
Black-headed grosbeak	Pheucticus melanocephalus	Upper and lower mandible	The oak trees known from La Brea would have offered a suitable habitat for this species.	
Black-throated sparrow	Amphispiza bilineata	Upper and lower mandibles	Although today preferring desert environments with sparse vegetation and contrasting with some of the other passerines from La Brea, the shrew Notiosbrex also found in the tar pits is known to have similar environmental preferences.	
Brown-headed cowbird	Molothrus ater	A single specimen		
California scrub jay	Aphelocoma californica	Eight specimen	One of several birds that likely inhabited the oak forests at La Brea.	
California thrasher	Toxostoma redivivum	Six specimen including a cranial fragment		
Canyon towhee	Melozone fusca	Two incomplete lower mandibles	A towhee species notably smaller than spotted towhee, which was initially thought to be present at La Brea.	
Cassin's kingbird	Tyrannus vociferans	Four specimen	Although today only breeding in the region around La Brea, it was a resident species during the Pleistocene.	
Cedar waxwing	Bombycilla cedrorum			
Chihuahuan raven	Corvus cryptoleucus	A single specimen	As the distribution of this species during the Last Glacial Maximum appears to be inconsistent with its presence at La Brea, Zink and colleagues argue that this might be a case of misidentification.	
Chipping sparrow	Spizella passerina	Six specimen		
Clark's nutcracker	Nucifraga columbiana	Two specimen		
Common raven	Corvus corax	114 specimen	One of the most common La Brea passerines, ravens from the pits show no response to the changing climate conditions caused by the Last Glacial Maximum. They were however more robust than their modern descendents.	
Eastern towhee	Pipilo erythrophthalamus			
† La Brea blackbird	† Euphagus magnirostris	A single specimen	A species of blackbird also known as the large-billed blackbird. Although first described from La Brea, its fossils were later also found in Peru and Venezuela.	
Evening grosbeak	Coccothraustes vespertinus	A single lower mandible	The La Brea material shows the same heavy symphysis as modern evening grosbeaks and further resembles them in the details of the mandible. Although it is a wandering species, individuals of this species are known to appear in modern Los Angeles.	
Fox sparrow	Passerella iliaca	Two lower mandibles	The two La Brea mandibles are of different size, falling within the ranges of the larger and smaller modern subspecies.	
Indeterminate Fringillidae				
Horned lark	Eremophila alpestris	At least one specimen	This species is less abundant in La Brea compared to other Pleistocene tar pits like the McKittrick tar seeps.	
Icterus spp.				
Lark sparrow	Chondestes grammacus	Three upper mandibles	The mandibles are assigned to the genus Chondestes and further to the lark sparrow due to the fact that it is the only known species of the genus.	
Loggerhead shrike	Lanius ludovicianus	Three specimen		
Cf. Mountain chickadee	Poecile gambeli			
† Convex-billed cowbird	† Pandanaris convexa	Upper and lower rostrum	A species of New World blackbirds with a short and deep beak, much more robust than that of the La Brea blackbird.	
Indeterminate Parulinae				
Pine siskin	Spinus pinus			
	† Pipilo angelensis	Two upper mandibles and six lower mandibles	A species of towhee first described from La Brea as Pipilo angelensis. It was of larger size than any modern Pipilo species.	
Cf. Red-winged blackbird	Agelaius phoeniceus californicus			
Sage thrasher	Oreoscoptes montanus	One specimen		
Song Sparrow	Melospiza melodia	Ten upper mandibles	The fossils are larger in size than the mandibles of the Lincoln's and swamp sparrow, instead matching the song sparrow the closest.	
Indeterminate sparrow	Spizella sp.	Six upper mandibles	The size of the nostrils in the most complete specimen resemble the American tree sparrow, however due to the fragmentary nature of the material no assignment is made.	
Steller's jay	Cyanocitta stelleri	Four specimen		
Vesper sparrow	Pooecetes gramineus	A single upper mandible	The La Brea fossil resembles material of the modern vesper sparrow, which is the only known extant species of Pooecetes from North America.	
Cf. Western bluebird	Sialia mexicana	Seven specimen		
Western meadowlark	Sturnella neglecta	125 specimen	Western meadowlarks are more common at La Brea compared to the McKittrick tar seeps and among the most common small birds in the asphalt seeps.	
White-crowned sparrow	Zonotrichia leucophrys	Three upper mandibles	Although two species of Zonotrichia are present in Los Angeles today, the fossil material matches the nostril shape of Z. leucophrys.	
Yellow-billed magpie	Pica nuttalli	174 specimen	One of the most common passerines at La Brea, there appears to be no response by magpies to the climate conditions changing during the Last Glacial Maximum.	
Yellow-headed blackbird	Xanthocephalus sp.			

=== Pelecaniformes ===
Common name	Species	Material	Notes	Image
American bittern	Botaurus lentiginosus			
Black-crowned night heron	Nycticorax nycticorax			
Great blue heron	Ardea herodias			
Great egret	Ardea alba	A tibiotarsus and coracoid		
Little blue heron?	Egretta caerulea?	A tarsometatarsus	The presence of the little blue heron at La Brea is deemed questionable due to the possible confusion with the tricolored heron.	
Roseate spoonbill	Platalea ajaja			
Snowy egret?	Egretta thula?	Several specimens	Although the material matches what is known from snowy egrets, early descriptions were uncertain about the assignment due to the lack of comparative material with the little blue and tricolored heron.	
Striated heron	Butorides striata	A tibiotarsus	These remains were initially assigned to the green heron, but later referred to the related striated heron instead.	
White-faced ibis	Plegadis chihi		Pleistocene records of this species are only known from La Brea and Térapa, Sonora.	

=== Piciformes ===
Common name	Species	Material	Notes	Image
	† Bitumenpicus minimus	8 fossil specimens that could belong to a single individual	The smallest woodpecker at La Brea, it was similar in size to Nuttall's woodpecker.	
	† Breacopus garretti	A carpometacarpus and the distal end of a tibiotarsus	The largest woodpecker found in the region, it was approximately the size of a modern pileated woodpecker. Its size suggests that large trees must have been present to some degree, probably scattered across the more open environment. The bones of Breacopus were initially misidentified as having belonged to the pileated woodpecker and although some bones referred to the modern species could not be located, Campbell and Bochenski argue that the missing material also likely represents Breacopus remains.	
Lewis's woodpecker	Melanerpes lewis	92 specimens belonging to at least 18 individual birds	A species of woodpecker still native to the region today. Its remains are common in the tar pits, possibly due to its habit of pursuing insects in flight. This would lead it closer to the asphalt seeps than woodpeckers drilling for food.	
	† Melanerpes shawi	18 specimens corresponding to at least 4 individuals	Melanerpes shawi was similar in size to the contemporary Lewis's woodpecker, making it one of the largest members of the genus.	
Northern flicker	Colaptes auratus	317 specimens suggesting a minimum of 38 individuals	The most numerous woodpecker found in the La Brea tarpits, likely due to its more terrestrial lifestyle. This would bring it into contact with the tar more commonly and thus lead to increased likelihood of being preserved.	
	Piciformes indet.	8 specimens	Woodpeckers similar in size to Sphyrapicus that could not be referred to any particular genus.	
Red-breasted sapsucker	Sphyrapicus ruber	A total of 26 specimens belonging to at least 4 individuals	As this species prefers open woodland, this species indicates that the environment of Rancho La Brea was relatively open. Howard reported at least three instances of Sphyrapicus sp. as well; of which one was lost, another was referred to S. ruber while the third could not be identified to species level.	

=== Podicipediformes ===
Common name	Species	Material	Notes	Image
Grebe	Podiceps sp.	A humerus	A grebe or loon, initially identified as Colymbus sp. by Miller and Howard, although Howard wrote that it might also belong to Podilymbus. Stock later listed the specimen as belonging to Podiceps.	
Pied-billed grebe	Podilymbus podiceps	A femur	The Grebe fossil was discovered in pit 16.	

=== Suliformes ===
Common name	Species	Material	Notes	Image
Cormorant	Phalacrocorax sp.			

== Reptiles ==
Common name	Species	Material	Notes	Image
California whipsnake	Masticophis lateralis	Mid and posterior trunk vertebrae	The first fossil material of this species was discovered at La Brea. It inhabited foothills, forests as well as chaparral, grassy and brushy regions.	
Centipede snake	Tantilla sp.	Multiple mid and posterior trunk vertebrae	Although the fossils match the western black-headed snake, which also occurs in California today, the material is not assigned to any particular species due to the often restricted range of centipede snakes and the fact that members of the genus are poorly understood.	
Coast horned lizard	Phrynosoma coronatum		Although present in La Brea during the Pleistocene, the coast horned lizard is now absent from the Los Angeles-Orange County basin, seemingly having gone extinct before the first historical records.	
Common garter snake	Thamnophis sirtalis	Mid trunk vertebrae	Common garter snakes are commonly found near aquatic environments. Unlike many of the other snakes from Rancho La Brea, it is not commonly found in the modern Los Angeles area, which is situated at the southern edge of its range.	
Common kingsnake	Lampropeltis getula	A maxilla and multiple vertebrae	A medium to large sized snake most active during the twilight hours and night. It ranges over a great area over the southern USA and is found in various Pleistocene localities.	
Common side-blotched lizard	Uta stansburiana		A desert lizard known to also enter wood- and shrublands, its fossils are common at Rancho La Brea.	
Desert night lizard?	Xantusia vigilis?		Remains of Xantusia were originally reported by Brattstrom in 1953, but later publications have called the identification into question, suggesting the fossils may have been those of an iguana in the genus Uta instead.	
Desert spiny lizard	Sceloporus magister		While the western fence lizard is still present in California, the desert spiny lizard has disappeared from the area and instead retreated to more arid regions.	
	Eumeces sp.		An skink assigned to the Eumeces genus. This genus underwent taxonomic revisions and American species have since then been placed in either Plestiodon or Mesoscincus.	
Garter snake	Thamnophis sp.	Over 900 specimen in pit 91	Remains of a snake within the genus Thamnophis that is not clearly identifiable as either of the two species known from the tar pits. Remains of Thamnophis sp. make up 64% of the snake fauna at pit 91.	
Indetermined tortoise			A land tortoise initially assigned to Geochelone. However, since then many species previously included in this genus were split into their own genera, with true members of Geochelone being endemic to Asia.	
Glossy snake	Arizona elegans	A few vertebrae	An open environment snake found in grasslands and chaparral.	
Great plains rattlesnake	Crotalus viridis	A dentary and various vertebrae	The only rattlesnake from Pleistocene South California identified to the species rank. It is known to have inhabited a wide range of environments excluding for deserts.	
Kingsnake	Lampropeltis sp.			
Legless lizard	Anniella sp.	Two isolated vertebrae	An indetermined species of legless lizard from Pit 91.	
Long-nosed snake	Rhinocheilus lecontei	Two vertebrae	A nocturnal snake inhabiting prairies, deserts and bushlands. It is still found in Los Angeles today. Within pit 91 it is the rarest occurring snake.	
Night snake	Hypsiglena torquata	Multiple mid and posterior trunk vertebrae as well as anterior trunk vertebrae, precloacal vertebrae and juvenile remains	Assignment to H. torquata was primarily based on geography. Although falling in the range of variation of the modern form, the fossil did show relatively shorter vertebrae.	
Pine snake	Pituophis melanoleucus	Multiple maxillae, a pterygoid and compound bone and great number of vertebrae	A common snake found at various Late Pleistocene sites, matching its generalist lifestyle not specialised in any particular habitat.	
Rattlesnake	Crotalus sp.			
Ring-necked snake	Diadophis punctatus	A maxilla, compound bone and a great number of mid trunk vertebrae. The allocated material includes anterior trunk vertebrae as well as material of juvenile individuals.	A snake that occurs in Los Angeles to this day, it prefers wetter environments including woodlands but can be found in more arid regions next to rivers.	
Sceloporine indet.		Various cranial and postcranial remains	Multiple remains referred the Sceloporus-group of Phrynosomatidae. No genus or species assignment could be made.	
cf. Sierra garter snake	Thamnophis cf. couchii	Mid and posterior trunk vertebrae	Due to taxonomic revisions of T. couchii it is not entirely certain which species this snake may have belonged to. Some members of the former T. couchii group, including T. couchii itself, were more waterbound while others were more terrestrial.	
Southern alligator lizard	Elgaria multicarinata			
Western fence lizard	Sceloporus occidentalis		The western fence lizard is still commonly found in coastal south California.	
Western pond turtle	Actinemys marmorata		A freshwater turtle that appears to not differ ecologically from the modern form.	
Western skink	Plestiodon skiltonianus			
Western whiptail	Aspidoscelis tigris		A long-tailed teiid lizard primarily found in arid regions.	
Western yellow-bellied racer	Coluber constrictor mormon	A maxilla, compound bone and a great number of various vertebrae	A well represented snake species known to inhabit semiarid to moist open environments.	

== Amphibians ==
Common name	Species	Material	Notes	Image
Arboreal salamander	Aneides lugubris			
Arizona toad	Anaxyrus microscaphus			
California toad	Anaxyrus boreas halophilus		Although initially described as a distinct species from La Brea, Anaxyrus nestor was later considered to be synonymous with the California toad.	
Northern red-legged frog	Rana aurora	A radioulna and a vertebra		
	Spea labreae	Fragmentary remains including sacro-urostyles	An extinct species of the western spadefoot toad genus Spea.	
Tree frog	Hyla sp.			

== Fish ==
Common name	Species	Material	Notes	Image
Arroyo chub	Gila orcutti	4 bones consisting of a dentary and three vertebrae	The largest vertebrae indicate trout with a standard length of 6.2 cm (2.4 in).	
Rainbow trout	Oncorhynchus mykiss	15 bones consisting of isolated vertebrae	The largest vertebrae indicate trout with a standard length of 15 cm (5.9 in).	
Three-spined stickleback	Gasterosteus aculeatus	51 bones consisting of pelvic spines, vertebrae and parts of the pelvis belonging to at least 23 individuals	The spines indicate that the sticklebacks of La Brea reached standard length of 3.5–4 cm (1.4–1.6 in).	

== Arthropods ==
=== Arachnids ===
Common name	Species	Material	Notes	Image
Harvestmen				
Scorpions				
Spiders				

=== Crustaceans ===
Common name	Species	Material	Notes	Image
Pill bugs				
Water fleas				

=== Insects ===
Common name	Species	Material	Notes	Image
	Amara insignis			
	Apsena laticornis (syn=Apsena labreae)			
	Apsena pubescens			
	Calosoma semilaeve			
	Canthon praticola			
	Canthon simplex subsp. antiquus			
	Cicindela haemorrhagica			
	Cicindela oregona			
	Coniontis abdominalis subsp. caseyi			
	Coniontis elliptica			
	Coniontis lamentabilis			
	Coniontis puncticollis			
	Coniontis remnans			
	Coniontis robusta			
	Copris pristinus			
Damsel and dragonflies				
	?Deltochilum sp.			
	Dytiscus marginicolliss			
	Eleodes (Eleodes) acuticauda (syn=Eleodes laticollis)			
	Eleodes (Eleodes) grandicollis (syn=Eleodes elongata)			
	Eleodes (Cratidus) osculans (syn=Eleodes behrii, E. consobrina, E. intermedia)			
Flies				
Grasshopper				
	Heterosilpha ramosa (syn=Silpha (Heterosilpha) ramosa)			
	Megachile gentilis			
	Necrobia violacea			
	Nicrophorus marginatus (syn=Nicrophorus guttulus, N. mckittricki, N. obtusiscutellum)			
	Nicrophorus nigrita (syn=Nicrophorus investigator)			
	Nyctoporis carinata			
	Onthophagus everestae			
	Phanaeus labreae (syn=Paleocopris labreae)			
	Phloeodes diabolicus (syn=Phloeodes pustulosus)			
	Phloeodes plicatus (syn=Noserus corrosus)			
	Pterostichus sp.			
	Cf. Platynus funebris			
	Serica kanakoffi			
Termites				
	Thanatophilus lapponicus (syn=Silpha (Thanatophilus) lapponica)			
True bugs and cicadas				
	Veromessor andrei			

=== Myriapods ===
Common name	Species	Material	Notes	Image
Centipedes				
	Hiltonius australis			
Millipedes				

== Diatoms ==
=== Achnanthaceae ===
Genus	Species	Authority	Notes	Image
Achnanthes	Achnanthes lanceolata	(Breb.) Grun.		
Cocconeis	Cocconeis placentula var. lineata	(Ehr.) V.H.		
Cocconeis	Cocconeis scutellum var. stauroneiformis	W. Smith		

=== Coscinodiscaceae ===
Genus	Species	authority	Notes	Image
Actinocyclus	Actinocyclus ehrenbergii			
Coscinodiscus	Coscinodiscus marginatus			
Coscinodiscus	Coscinodiscus radiatus			
Melosira	Melosira clavigera			
Melosira	Melosira italica			
Stephanodiscus	Stephanodiscus astraea			

=== Cymbellaceae ===
Genus	Species	authority	Notes	Image
Amphora	Amphora coffeiformis var. coffeiformis	(Ag.) Kutz.		
Amphora	Amphora normanii var. normanii	Rabh.		
Amphora	Amphora ovalis var. affinis	(Kutz.) V.H. ex DeT.		
Amphora	Amphora ovalis var. pediculus	(Kutz.) V.H. ex DeT.		
Amphora	Amphora venata var. venata	Kutz.		
Cymbella	Cymbella cistula var. cistula	(Ehr.) Kirchn.		
Cymbella	Cymbella mexicana var. mexicana	(Ehr.) Cl.		
Cymbella	Cymbella muelleri var. muelleri	Hust.		

=== Epithemiaceae ===
Genus	Species	authority	Notes	Image
Denticula	Denticula elegans var. elegans	Kutz.		
Denticula	Denticula elegans var. kittoniana	(Grun.) DeT.		
Denticula	Denticula lauta var. lauta	J.W. Bail.		
Epithemia	Epithemia adnata var. minor	(Perag. & Herb) Patr.		
Epithemia	Epithemia emarginata var. emarginata	Andrews		
Epithemia	Epithemia intermedia var. intermedia	Fricke		
Epithemia	Epithemia turgida var. turgida	(Ehr.) Kutz.		
Epithemia	Epithemia turgida var. westermanii	(Ehr.) Grun.		
Rhopalodia	Rhopalodia gibba var. gibba	(Ehr.) O. Mull.		
Rhopalodia	Rhopalodia gibburula var. gibberula	(Ehr.) O. Mull.		
Rhopalodia	Rhopalodia musculus var. musculus	(Kutz.) O. Mull.		

=== Fragilariaceae ===
Genus	Species	authority	Notes	Image
Fragilaria	Fragilaria bicapitata var. bicapitata			
Fragilaria	Fragilaria construens var. binodis	(Ehr.)		
Fragilaria	Fragilaria vaucheriae var. vaucheriae			
Fragilaria	Fragilaria virescens var. virescens			
Meridion	Meridion circulare var. constrictum			
Synedra	Synedra fasciculata var. truncata	(Grev.)		
Synedra	Synedra ulna var. ulna			

=== Gomphonemaceae ===
Genus	Species	authority	Notes	Image
Gomphonema	Gomphonema affine var. affine			
Gomphonema	Gomphonema insigne	Greg.		
Gomphonema	Gomphonema angustatum var. angustatum	(Kutz.) Rabh.		
Gomphonema	Gomphonema parvulum var. micropus	(Kützing) Kützing, 1849		
Gomphonema	Gomphonema subclavatum var. commutatum	(Grun.) A. Maye		

=== Nitzchiaceae ===
Genus	Species	authority	Notes	Image
Hanzschia	Hanzschia amphioxys			
Nitzschia	Nitzschia angustata var. acuta	Grun.		
Nitzschia	Nitzschia denticulae	Grun.		
Nitzschia	Nitzschia fonticola	Grun.		
Nitzschia	Nitzschia frustulum	(Kutz.) Grun.		
Nitzschia	Nitzschia hungarcia	Grun.		
Nitzschia	Nitzschia ignorata var. ignorata	Krasske		
Nitzschia	Nitzschia palea	(Kutz.) W. Sm.		

=== Naviculaceae ===
Genus	Species	authority	Notes	Image
Anomoeoneis	Anomoeoneis sphaerophora var. sphaerophora			
Caloneis	Caloneis bacillum var. bacillum	(Grun.) Cl.		
Caloneis	Caloneis lewisii var. lewisii	Patr.		
Caloneis	Caloneis limosa var. limosa	(Kutz.) Patr.		
Caloneis	Caloneis ventricosa var. minuta	(Grun.) Patr.		
Diploneis	Diploneis elliptica var. elliptica	(Kutz.) Cl.		
Diploneis	Diploneis didyma var. didyma	(Ehr.)		
Diploneis	Diploneis pseudovalis var. pseudovalis	Hust.		
Mastogloia	Mastogloia elliptica var. danseii	(Thwaites) Cl.		
Navicula	Navicula aurora var. aurora	Sov.		
Navicula	Navicula cuspidata var. cuspidata	(Kutz.)		
Navicula	Navicula cuspidata var. major	Meist.		
Navicula	Navicula halophila var. halophila	(Grun.) Cl.		
Navicula	Navicula laneplata var. lanceolata	(Ag.)		
Navicula	Navicula mutica var. mutica	Kutz.		
Navicula	Navicula mutica var. cohnii	(Hilse) Grun.		
Navicula	Navicula peregrina var. peregrina	(Ehr.) Kutz.		
Navicula	Navicula pseudoatomus	Lund		
Navicula	Navicula pupula var. pupula	Kutz.		
Navicula	Navicula pygmaea var. pygmaea	Kutz.		
Navicula	Navicula radiosa var. radiosa	Kutz.		
Navicula	Navicula viridula var. slesvicensis	(Grun.) Cl.		
Neidium	Neidium iridis var. iridis	(Ehr.) Cl.		
Pinnularia	Pinnularia borealis var. borealis	Ehr.		
Pinnularia	Pinnularia brebissonii var. brebissonii	(Kutz.) Rabh.		
Pinnularia	Pinnularia intermedia var. intermedia	(Lagerst.) Cl.		
Pinnularia	Pinnularia viridis var. viridis	(Nitz.) Ehr.		
Stauroneis	Stauroneis acuta var. acuta	W. Sm.		
Stauroneis	Cf. Stauroneis anceps var. linearis	(Ehr.) Hust.		
Stauroneis	Stauroneis laterostrata	Hust.		

== Charophyte green algaes ==
=== Characeae ===
Name	Species	Material	Notes	Image
	Chara sp.			

== Conifers ==
=== Cupressaceae ===
Name	Species	Material	Notes	Image
Californian cypress	Cupressus goveniana			
California juniper	Juniperus californica			
Coastal Redwood	Sequoia sempervirens			
Monterey cypress	Cupressus macrocarpa			
Tecate cypress	Cupressus forbesii			
cf. West Indies juniper	cf. Juniperus barbadensis			

=== Pinaceae ===
Name	Species	Material	Notes	Image
Bishop pine	Pinus muricata			
Foothill pine	Pinus sabiniana			
Monterey pine	Pinus radiata			

== Monocot flowering plants ==
=== Order Poales ===
Name	Species	Material	Notes	Image
Chess grass	Bromus sp.			
Club-rush	Scirpus spp.			
Curly mesquite	Hilaria sp.			
	Festuca sp.			
Giant bur-reed	Sparganium eurycarpum			
Grama grass	Bouteloua sp.			
Spikesedge	Eleocharis sp.			
True sedge	Carex sp.			
Sacaton grass	Sporobolus sp.			

=== Order Alismatales ===
Name	Species	Material	Notes	Image
Arrowhead	Sagittaria sp.			
Horned pondweed	Zannichellia palustris			
Pondweed	Potamogeton sp.			
Water-nymph	Najas sp.			

=== Order Liliales ===
Name	Species	Material	Notes	Image
Western blue-eyed grass	Sisyrinchium bellum			

== Dicot flowering plants ==
=== Order Campanulales ===
Common name	Species	Material	Notes	Image
Ragweed	Ambrosia sp.			
Clustered tarweed	Hemizonia fasciculata			
False rosinweed	Osmadenia tenella			
Large cocklebur	Xanthium strumarium			
Sagebrush	Artemisia sp.			
Tarweed	Madia sp.			
Thistle	Cirsium sp.			

=== Juglandaceae ===
Name	Species	Material	Notes	Image
California black walnut	Juglans californica			

=== Salicaceae ===
Name	Species	Material	Notes	Image
Arroyo willow	Salix lasiolepis			

=== Ulmaceae ===
Name	Species	Material	Notes	Image
Hackberry	Celtis reticulata			

=== Betulaceae ===
Name	Species	Material	Notes	Image
White alder	Alnus rhombifolia			

=== Fagaceae ===
Name	Species	Material	Notes	Image
Coast live oak	Quercus agrifolia			
Nuttall's scrub oak	Quercus dumosa			
Valley oak	Quercus lobata			

=== Caryophyllales ===
Name	Species	Material	Notes	Image
Wild buckwheat	Eriogonum sp.			
Willow dock	Rumex salicifolius			

=== Chenopodiaceae ===
Name	Species	Material	Notes	Image
Goosefoot	Chenopodium sp.			
Saltbush	Atriplex sp.			
Winterfat	Krascheninnikovia lanata			

=== Amaranthaceae ===
Name	Species	Material	Notes	Image
Amaranth	Amaranthus sp.			

=== Portulacaceae ===
Name	Species	Material	Notes	Image
Fringed redmaids	Calandrinia ciliata			
Miner's lettuce	Claytonia perfoliata			

=== Ranunculaceae ===
Name	Species	Material	Notes	Image
Buttercup	Ranunculus sp.			
Water-crowfoot	Ranunculus aquatilis			

=== Berberidaceae ===
Name	Species	Material	Notes	Image
Barberry	Berberis sp.			

=== Lauraceae ===
Name	Species	Material	Notes	Image
California bay	Umbellularia californica			

=== Platanaceae ===
Name	Species	Material	Notes	Image
Western sycamore	Platanus racemosa			

=== Rosaceae ===
Name	Species	Material	Notes	Image
California blackberry	Rubus vitifolius			
Chamise	Adenostoma fasciculatum			

=== Anacardiaceae ===
Name	Species	Material	Notes	Image
Pacific poison oak	Toxicodendron diversilobum			

=== Aceraceae ===
Name	Species	Material	Notes	Image
Box elder	Acer negundo			

=== Balsaminaceae ===
Name	Species	Material	Notes	Image
Deltoid balsamroot	Balsamorhiza deltoidea			

=== Rhamnaceae ===
Name	Species	Material	Notes	Image
California coffeeberry	Rhamnus californica			
Soap bush	Ceanothus sp.			

=== Malvaceae ===
Name	Species	Material	Notes	Image
Globemallow	Sphaeralcea sp.			

=== Apiaceae ===
Name	Species	Material	Notes	Image
Lesser water-parsnip	Berula erecta			
Water parsley	Oenanthe sarmentosa			

=== Cornaceae ===
Name	Species	Material	Notes	Image
Dogwood	Cornus californica			

=== Ericaceae ===
Name	Species	Material	Notes	Image
Bigberry manzanita	Arctostaphylos glauca			
Island manzanita	Arctostaphylos insularis			
Mission manzanita	Xylococcus bicolor			
Morro manzanita	Arctostaphylos morroensis			
Pecho manzanita	Arctostaphylos pechoensis			
Pointleaf manzanita	Arctostaphylos pungens			
Whiteleaf manzanita	Arctostaphylos viscida			
Woollyleaf manzanita	Arctostaphylos tomentosa			

=== Convolvulaceae ===
Name	Species	Material	Notes	Image
Bindweed	Convolvulus sp.			

=== Lamiaceae ===
Name	Species	Material	Notes	Image
Sage	Salvia sp.			

=== Scrophulariacaea ===
Name	Species	Material	Notes	Image
Nuttall's snapdragon	Antirrhinum nuttallianum			
Purple owl's clover	Orthocarpus purpurascens			

=== Verbenaceae ===
Name	Species	Material	Notes	Image
Verveine	Verbena spp.			

=== Rubiaceae ===
Name	Species	Material	Notes	Image
Three-petal bedstraw	Galium trifidum			

=== Caprifoliaceae ===
Name	Species	Material	Notes	Image
Mexican elderberry	Sambucus mexicana			
