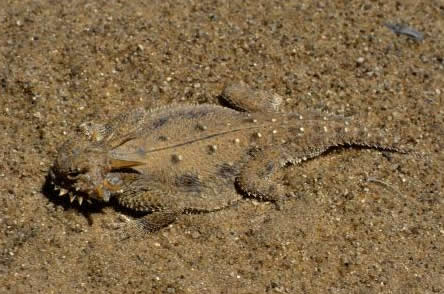

Conservation status
- Near Threatened (IUCN 3.1)

Scientific classification
- Kingdom: Animalia
- Phylum: Chordata
- Class: Reptilia
- Order: Squamata
- Suborder: Iguania
- Family: Phrynosomatidae
- Genus: Phrynosoma
- Species: P. mcallii

Binomial name
- Phrynosoma mcallii (Hallowell, 1852)

Synonyms
- List: Anota M'Callii Hallowell, 1852; Doliosaurus mc'calli (Hallowell, 1852); Phrynosoma Maccalli (Hallowell, 1852); Phrynosoma maccallii (Hallowell, 1852); Phrynosoma (Anota) mcallii (Hallowell, 1852)

= Flat-tail horned lizard =

Species of lizard

The flat-tail horned lizard (Phrynosoma mcallii), also known commonly as the flat-tailed horned lizard, is a species of lizard in the family Phrynosomatidae. A species of reptile, it is endemic to the Sonoran Desert of the southwestern United States and northwestern Mexico. Its multiple adaptations for camouflage help to minimize its shadow. The species is threatened, with a restricted range under pressure from human activities such as agriculture and development, and is specially protected in the United States.

== Description and geographic range ==
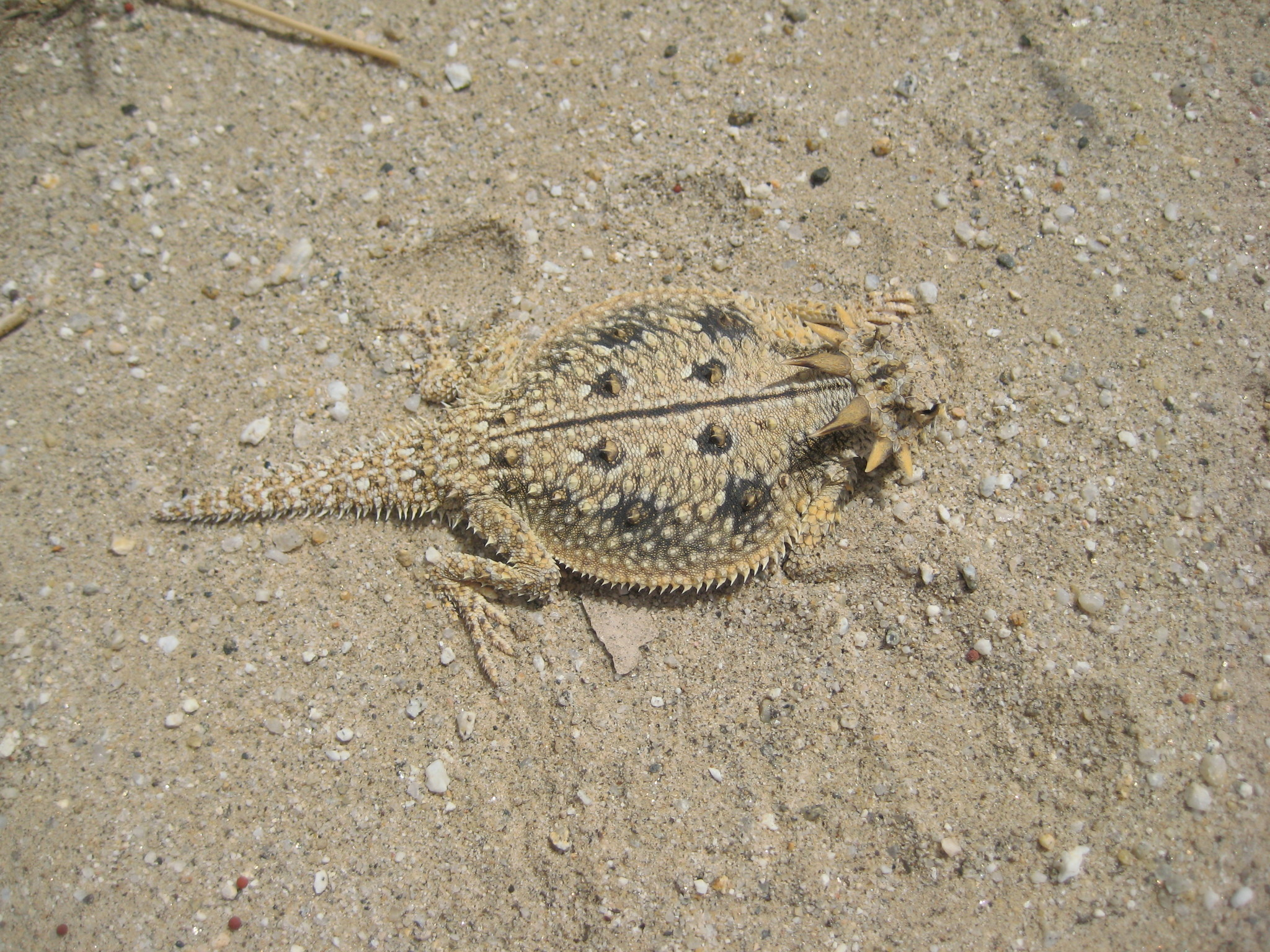
In California

The flat-tail horned lizard is named for United States Army Colonel George A. M'Call, who collected the first specimen in California in the 19th century. The species occupies a small range in the Sonoran Desert of southeastern California, southwestern Arizona, and extreme northern Mexico in the Baja California and Sonora states. Over time, horned lizard populations have adapted to climate, food, and predators, causing them to in some ways be distinct from one another.

"A medium-sized flat-bodied lizard with a wide oval-shaped body and scattered enlarged pointed scales on the upper body and tail. The back skin is smooth with small spines. 8 horns extend from the back of the head. The two central horns are long, slender and sharp. Long and narrow spines on the lower jaw and two rows of fringe scales on the sides of the body, the bottom row scales smaller than the upper."

== Camouflage techniques ==
The flat-tail horned lizard has flanges with fringed edges to conceal its shadow in the open desert. Diagram illustrates the camouflage principles involved.

The flat-tail horned lizard has evolved elaborate camouflage measures to eliminate shadow. Its body is flattened, with the sides thinning to an edge; the animal habitually presses its body to the ground; and its sides are fringed with white scales which effectively hide and disrupt any remaining areas of shadow there may be under the edge of the body.

Different populations of the species match their local backgrounds using a combination of color-creating cells in the dorsal scales. These cells include black melanophores and red chromatophores in an upper layer, scattered over a layer of white reflective iridophores, enabling the flat-tail horned lizard to match the local soil or rock. So for example the Algondones Dunes population of San Luis, Sonora is generally redder than the population on the whiter Thousand Palms dunes of California. In addition, the dark midline helps to disrupt the outline of the lizard, resembling the thin shadows of plant stems in its windswept sand habitat.

== Reproduction ==
Phrynosoma mcallii is oviparous.

== Conservation status ==
The flat-tail horned lizard is threatened by development, agriculture, and other man-made intrusions into its small range. The majority of its remaining habitat in the US is administered by the Bureau of Land Management. The species (Phrynosoma mcallii) frequently coexists with sources of natural gas, oil, geothermal energy, and minerals which can found in its habitat. In 1982, the US Fish and Wildlife Service declared P. mcallii as a "Candidate 2 Category" for the list of threatened and endangered species due to concerns over potential threats to its habitat which could further diminish the population. P. mcallii has also been given special status in both California and Arizona, which prevents its collection.

Experiments have been conducted to investigate the "fluctuations in populations of flat-tailed horned lizards, Phrynosoma mcallii, in the Coachella Valley, California. This species has the smallest range of any horned lizard in the United States. In parts of its range, there are potentially conflicting activities, such as suburban development, agriculture, off-road recreation, and activities along the international border."

"Between 1978 and 1980 the Bureau of Land Management supported investigations of the status of P. mcallii in California. The purpose of this work was to determine the local distribution and relative abundance of P. mcallii, to correlate these parameters with various habitat attributes, and to gather information on the structure of the populations and mobility and food habits of individual lizards."

The study also looked at the flat-tailed horned lizard's distribution and abundance throughout Arizona. The species was found to be restricted to an area of desert, 650–700 km^{2} (251–270 mi^{2}) in size, in the southwestern corner of the state. The species was most abundant in places with the Western whiptail (Aspidoscelis tigris), nests of the black harvester ant (Messor pergandei), galleta grass (Hilaria rigida) and sandy soils.
