= Euryopis californica =

Scientific classification
- Domain: Eukaryota
- Kingdom: Animalia
- Phylum: Arthropoda
- Subphylum: Chelicerata
- Class: Arachnida
- Order: Araneae
- Infraorder: Araneomorphae
- Family: Theridiidae
- Genus: Euryopis
- Species: E. californica

Binomial name
- Euryopis californica Banks, 1904

Species of spider

Euryopis californica is a species of cobweb spider in the family Theridiidae. It is found in the United States and Mexico. The species is a known predator of Veromessor pergandei ants.
