= Nyctoporis =

Scientific classification
- Domain: Eukaryota
- Kingdom: Animalia
- Phylum: Arthropoda
- Class: Insecta
- Order: Coleoptera
- Suborder: Polyphaga
- Infraorder: Cucujiformia
- Family: Tenebrionidae
- Subfamily: Pimeliinae
- Tribe: Nyctoporini
- Genus: Nyctoporis; Eschscholtz, 1831

Genus of beetles

Nyctoporis is a genus of darkling beetles in the family Tenebrionidae. There are about five described species in Nyctoporis, found in North America.

== Species ==
These species belong to the genus Nyctoporis:

- Nyctoporis aequicollis Eschscholtz, 1831
- Nyctoporis carinata LeConte 1851
- Nyctoporis cristata Eschscholtz, 1831
- Nyctoporis sponsa Casey, 1907
- Nyctoporis vandykei Blaisdell, 1931
