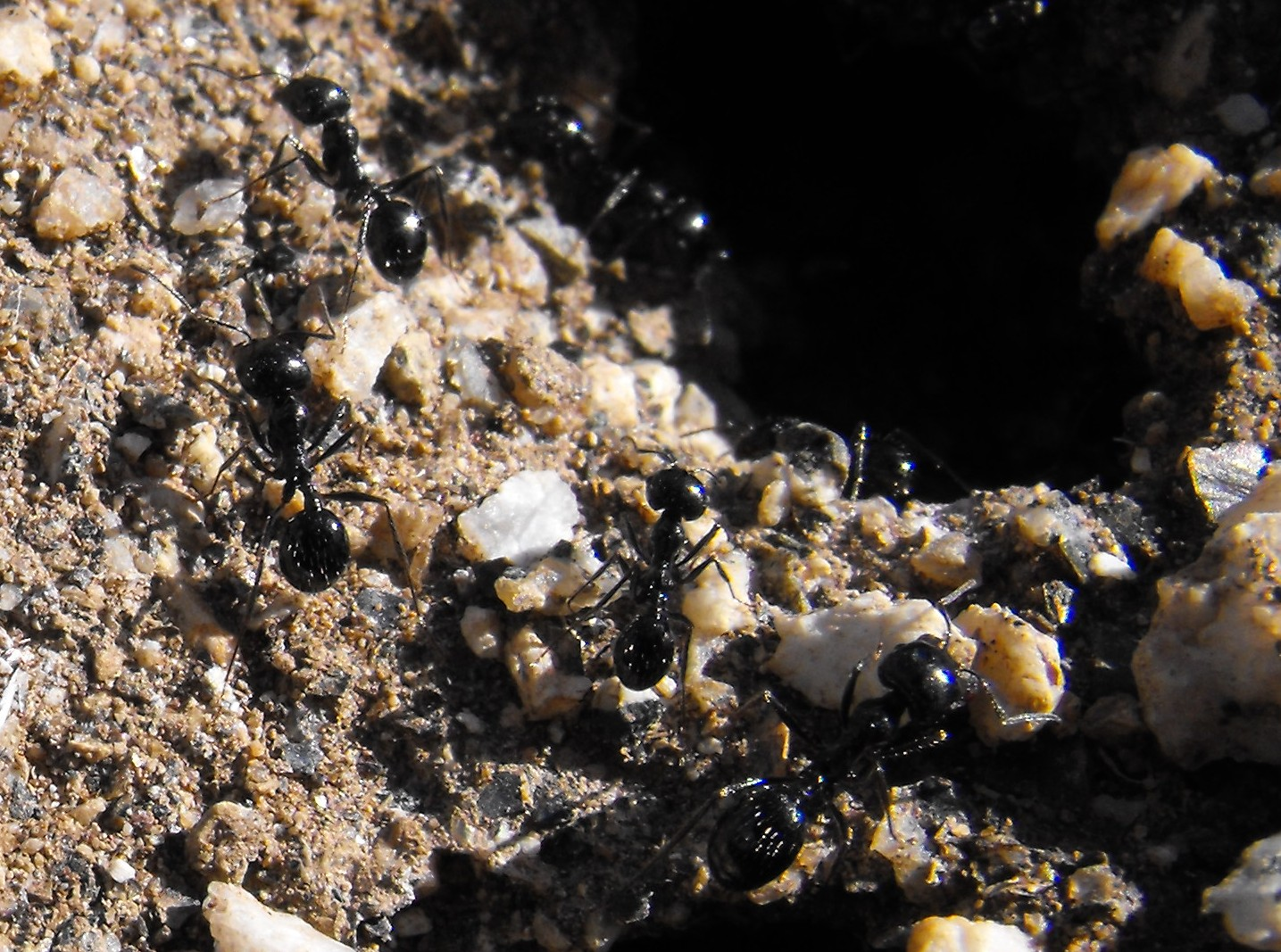
- V. pergandei nest entrance

Scientific classification
- Kingdom: Animalia
- Phylum: Arthropoda
- Clade: Pancrustacea
- Class: Insecta
- Order: Hymenoptera
- Family: Formicidae
- Subfamily: Myrmicinae
- Tribe: Stenammini
- Genus: Veromessor; Forel, 1917

Type species
- Aphaenogaster andrei Mayr, 1886

Diversity
- 10 species

= Veromessor =

Genus of ants

Veromessor is a genus of North American harvester ants in the subfamily Myrmicinae. The genus was previously classified as a synonym of Messor, but was revived as a genus by Ward et al. (2015). They are primarily found in arid and semi-arid regions of western North America, with the greatest diversity in California.

== Distribution ==
Veromessor ants are endemic to arid and semi-arid regions of North America. V. lobognathus may stretch as far northeast as North Dakota, while most of the genus is concentrated in the American Southwest and the Baja California peninsula.

== Ecology ==
Veromessor harvester ants are granivores, meaning they primarily eat and collect seeds to consume. They typically live in arid and semi-arid regions like creosote bush scrub or chaparral. Colony sizes for mature colonies may range from less than 1,000 workers in most species to over 50,000 in V. andrei, V. julianus, and V. pergandei. Nuptial flights occur in summer for most species except for V. julianus and V. pergandei, whose nuptial flights occur from late winter to early spring.

== Species ==
As of 2025, the genus comprises ten species, all of which are endemic to western and central North America.

- Veromessor andrei (Mayr, 1886)
- Veromessor chamberlini Wheeler, 1915
- Veromessor chicoensis Smith, 1956
- Veromessor julianus (Pergande, 1894)
- Veromessor lariversi Smith, 1951
- Veromessor lobognathus (Andrews, 1916)
- Veromessor pergandei (Mayr, 1886)
- Veromessor pseudolariversi Johnson et al., 2022
- Veromessor smithi Cole, 1963
- Veromessor stoddardi (Emery, 1895)

== Phylogeny ==
Borowiec et al. 2025 provided three hypotheses for the evolution of Veromessor species. The maximum-probability cladogram is shown here.

- Veromessor
  - - V. julianus
    - - V. chamberlini
      - V. andrei
  - - - V. stoddardi
      - V. chicoensis
    - - - V. smithi
        - V. lobognathus
      - - V. pergandei
        - - V. lariversi
          - V. pseudolariversi
