= Heterosilpha =

Scientific classification
- Kingdom: Animalia
- Phylum: Arthropoda
- Clade: Pancrustacea
- Class: Insecta
- Order: Coleoptera
- Suborder: Polyphaga
- Infraorder: Staphyliniformia
- Family: Staphylinidae
- Tribe: Silphini
- Genus: Heterosilpha; Portevin, 1926

Genus of beetles

Heterosilpha is a genus of carrion beetles in the family Silphidae. There are at least two described species in Heterosilpha.

== Species ==
These two species belong to the genus Heterosilpha:

- Heterosilpha aenescens (Casey, 1886)
- Heterosilpha ramosa (Say, 1823) (garden carrion beetle)
