= Buteogallus daggetti =

Buteogallus daggetti Temporal range: Pleistocene

Scientific classification
- Kingdom: Animalia
- Phylum: Chordata
- Class: Aves
- Order: Accipitriformes
- Family: Accipitridae
- Genus: Buteogallus
- Species: B. daggetti

Binomial name
- Buteogallus daggetti (Miller, 1915)

Synonyms
- Morphnus daggetti Wetmoregyps daggetti

Extinct species of bird

Buteogallus daggetti, occasionally called "Daggett's eagle" or the "walking eagle", is an extinct species of long-legged hawk which lived in southwest North America during the Pleistocene. Initially believed to be some sort of carrion-eating eagle, it was for some time placed in the distinct genus Wetmoregyps, named for Alexander Wetmore. It probably resembled a larger version of the modern-day savanna hawk, with its long legs possibly used like the modern-day secretarybird of Africa to hunt for small reptiles from a safe distance. It died out about 13,000 years ago.

Fossils of B. daggetti were discovered in the La Brea and Carpinteria lagerstätte in southern California, and in Nuevo León in Mexico. Its habitat included grasslands, marshlands, brushy savannas and ponds. It probably ate mostly small reptiles such as snakes. As is often the case with birds of prey, the female seems to have been larger than the male.

== Description ==
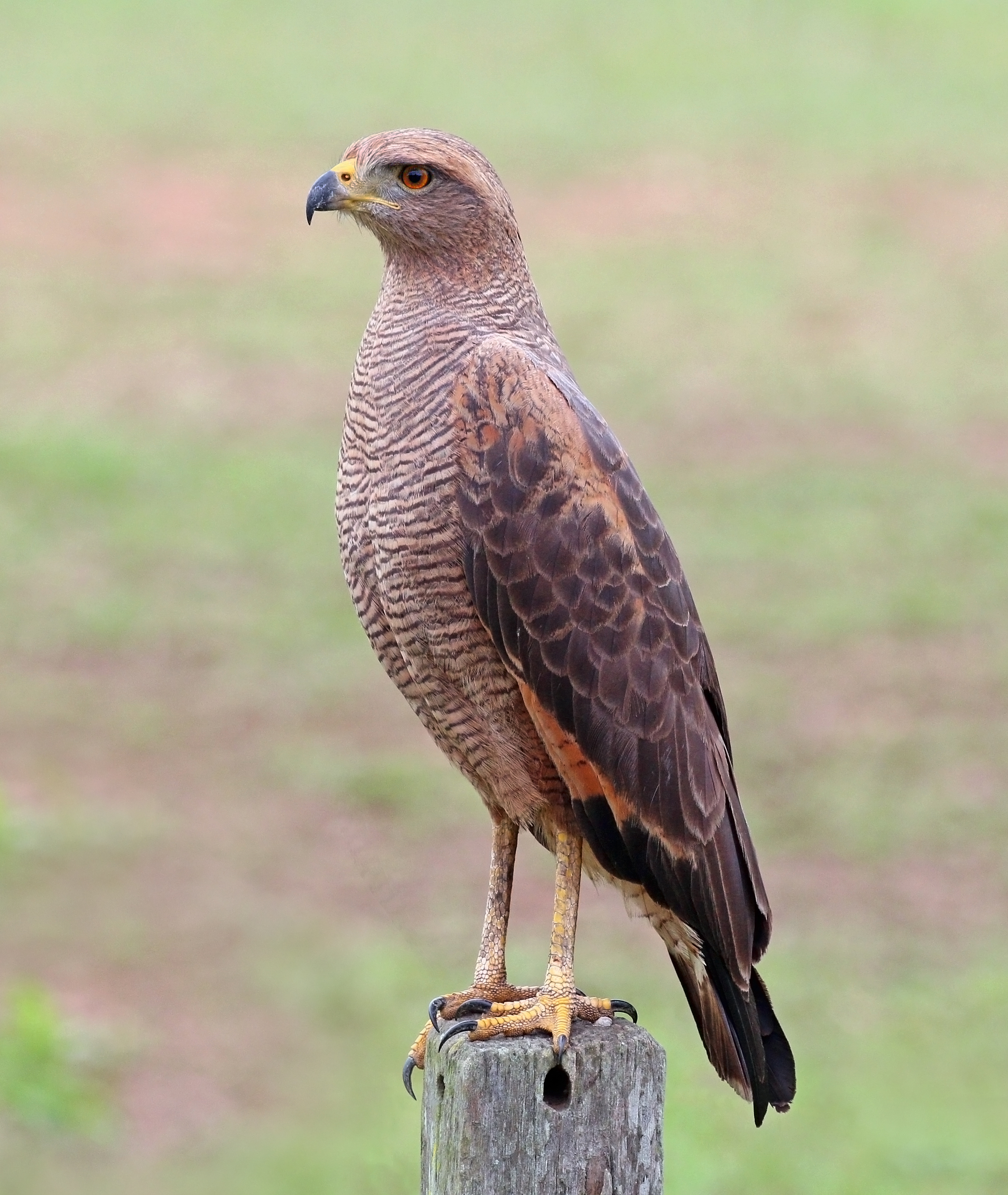
A savanna hawk, in the same genus and thought to be similar in appearance

In life, B. daggetti is thought to have resembled the related savanna hawk, also of the genus Buteogallus: B. daggetti had long legs which earned it the nickname "walking eagle". Miller (1915) concluded that these legs had little lifting power and weakly grasping claws compared to eagles that hunt on the wing. Conversely, the points of strong muscle attachment on the shaft of the tarsus suggest walking proficiency. He likened this "degeneracy" to the relationship of the roadrunner to tree-dwelling cuckoos. As with many birds, its females were larger than the males, an example of sexual dimorphism.

However, it is some 40 percent larger than the savanna hawk. This gives it a total length of 64–90 centimetres (25–35 in), including 26–32.2 cm (10.2–12.7 in) of tail; its wingspan would have been 169–196 cm (67–77 in). Body weight is estimated at 3 kilograms (6.6 lb). This makes it quite a heavy raptor, slightly greater than the modern-day secretarybird of Africa. This African raptor shares the long legs of B. daggetti and their lifestyles may have been similar (see "Behavior and ecology" below).

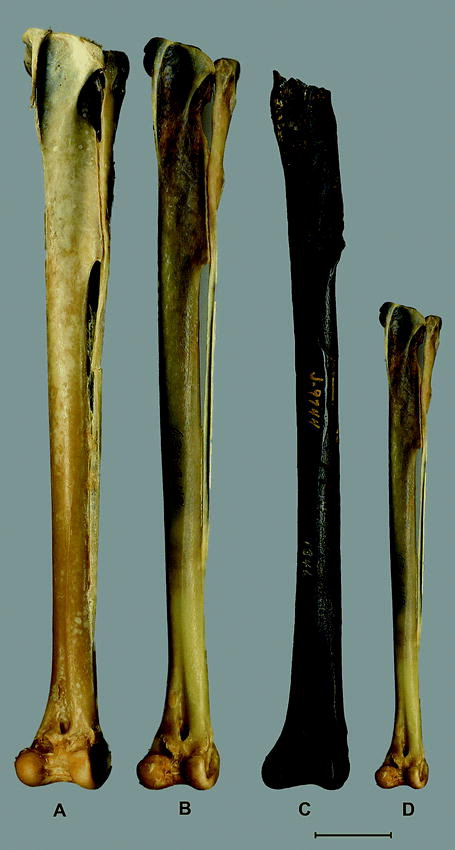
Comparison of Buteogallus tibiotarsi

== History ==
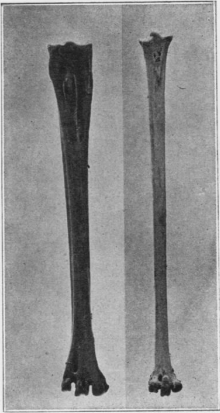
Comparison of B. daggetti and great blue heron tarsometatarsi

Buteogallus daggetti was first described by Loye Holmes Miller in 1915 as Morphnus daggetti, from a tarsometatarsus found in the La Brea Tar Pits. The bone's great length, comparable to a great blue heron's, gave him the impression of an "eagle on stilts" and led to comparisons with the secretarybird. The specific name pays tribute to F.S. Daggett of the Natural History Museum of Los Angeles County (at the time the Museum of History, Science, and Art). By 1925, Miller had assigned three more tarsometatarsi and an incomplete tibiotarsus to the genus.

In 1932, Hildegarde Howard assigned a coracoid and (tentatively) some phalanges to Wetmoregyps from specimens at the tar pits. She noted these fossils were difficult to distinguish from those of Woodward's eagle (Buteogallus woodwardi), a huge bird of prey in the same genus as the savanna hawk.

In 1928 and 1931, having obtained more fragmentary tarsometarsi from the Carpinteria asphalt, he reexamined his conclusions and found the bird more similar to Caracara and the great black hawk (Buteogallus urubitinga). He nevertheless assigned it to the new genus Wetmoregyps, possibly because it was much bigger than those aforementioned birds. In 1943 Miller wrote on two coracoids and a tarsometatarsus from San Josecito Cavern in Nuevo León, Mexico.

Storrs L. Olson studied the bird in 2007 and placed it in the genus Buteogallus owing to its similarity to the savanna hawk.

== Behavior and ecology ==
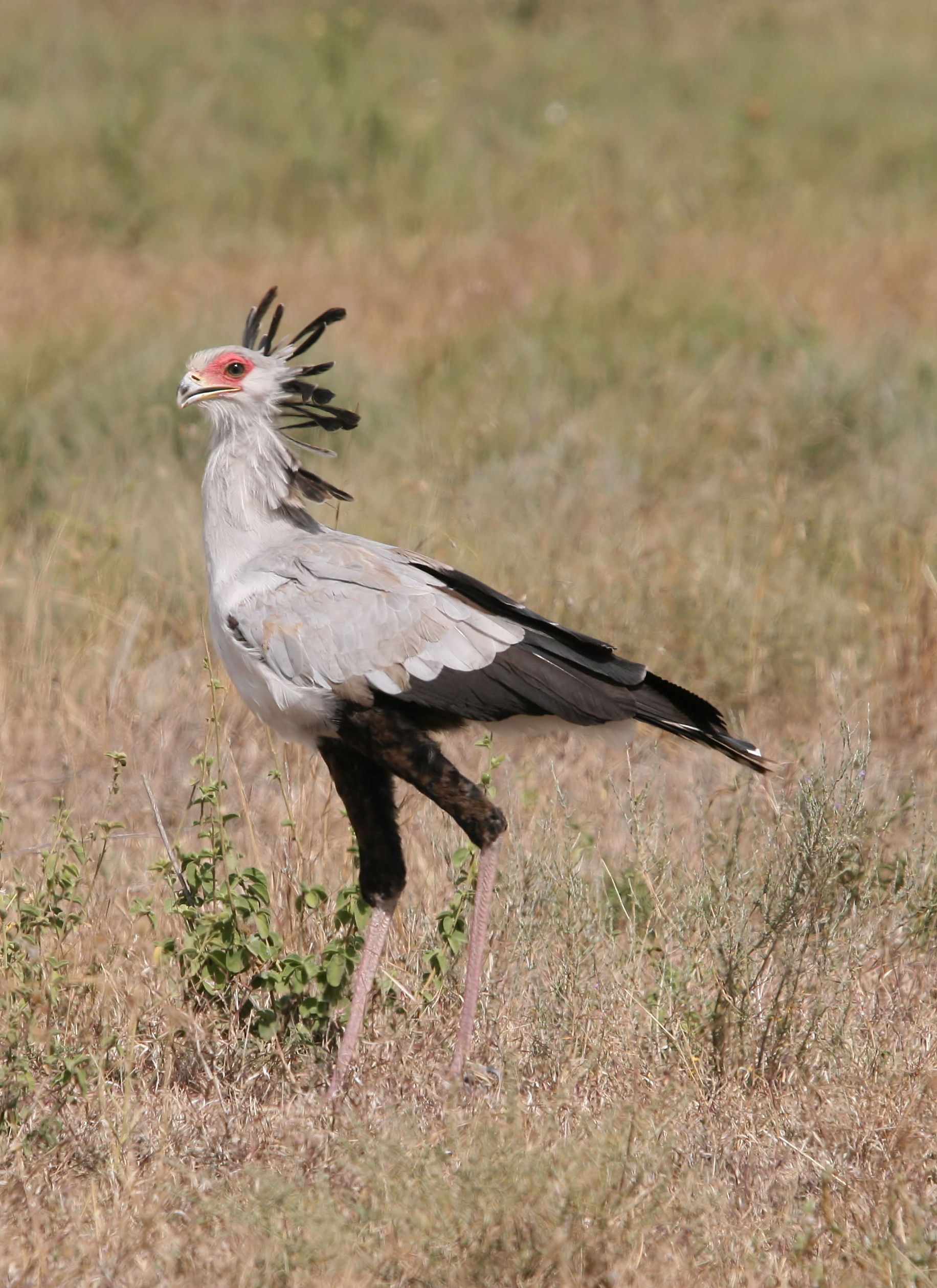
B. daggetti may have lived like the modern-day secretarybird

Buteogallus daggetti habitats comprised open grasslands, marshlands, and savannas from sea level to 2,250 metres (7,380 ft).

Because of its large size and long legs, B. daggetti is theorized to have lived rather like the modern-day secretarybird. Its diet would have been composed mostly of snakes and other small reptiles, which it would have kicked to death with its long legs. Not just good weapons, these legs would have kept the bird at a safe distance from its struggling prey. Olson's paper guessed that B. daggetti may have been attracted to grass fires as the savanna hawk is today. These fires chase out small animals, which then make easy prey for the raptors.

Olson disputes claims that B. daggetti was primarily a scavenger, and that its extinction was somehow linked to the decline of the North American Pleistocene megafauna. He likewise found Miller's vision of the bird as a forest-dweller "spurious".
