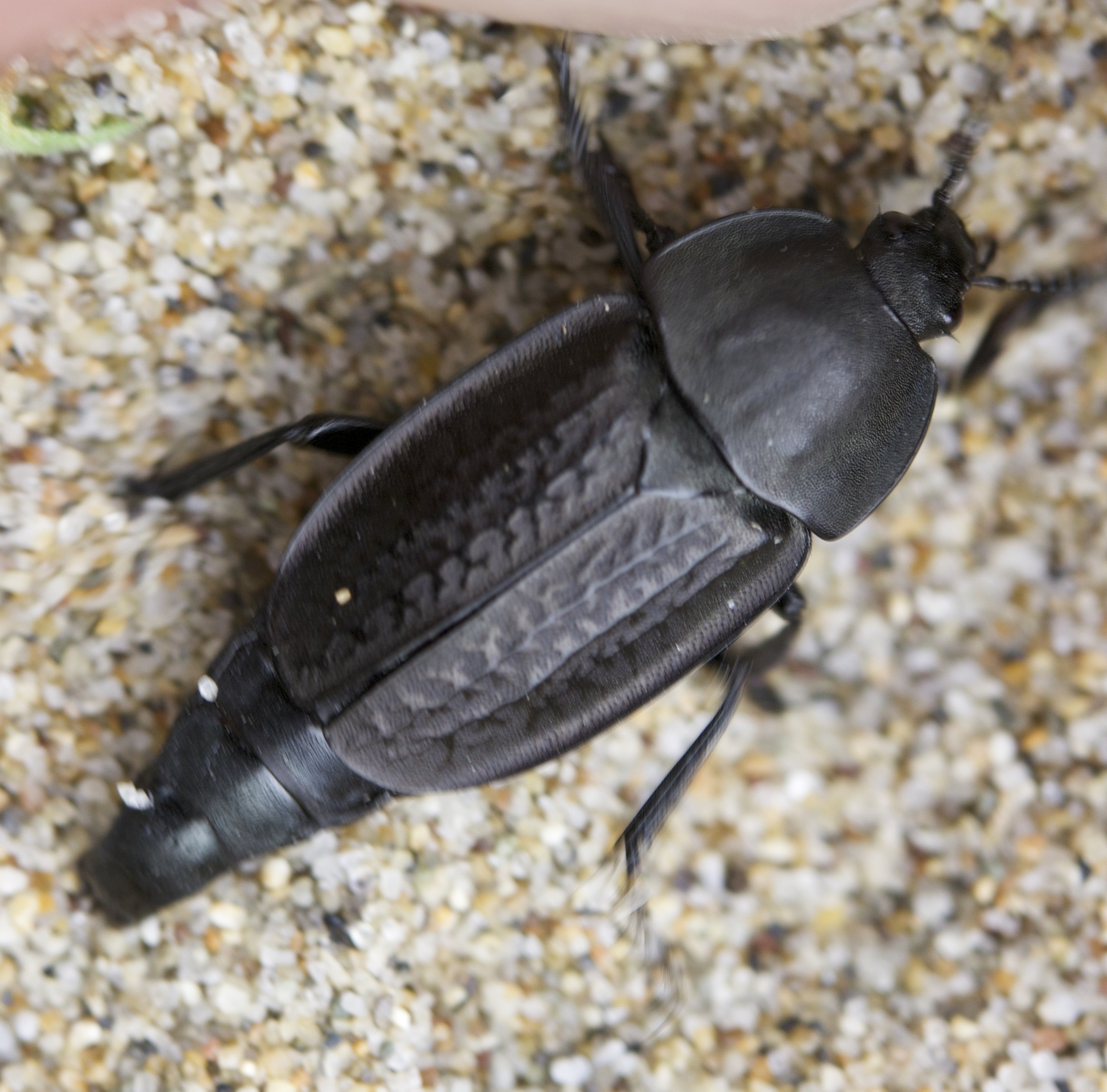

Scientific classification
- Kingdom: Animalia
- Phylum: Arthropoda
- Clade: Pancrustacea
- Class: Insecta
- Order: Coleoptera
- Suborder: Polyphaga
- Infraorder: Staphyliniformia
- Family: Staphylinidae
- Genus: Heterosilpha
- Species: H. aenescens

Binomial name
- Heterosilpha aenescens (Casey, 1886)

= Heterosilpha aenescens =

Species of beetle

Heterosilpha aenescens is a species of carrion beetle in the family Silphidae. It is found in Central America and North America.
