= Denticula elegans =

Scientific classification
- Domain: Eukaryota
- Clade: Sar
- Clade: Stramenopiles
- Division: Ochrophyta
- Clade: Bacillariophyta
- Class: Bacillariophyceae
- Order: Bacillariales
- Family: Bacillariaceae
- Genus: Denticula
- Species: D. elegans

Binomial name
- Denticula elegans Kütz., 1844

Synonyms
- Denticula elegans var. ocellata (W.Smith) Grunow, 1882-1885

Species of single-celled organism

Denticula elegans is a species of diatoms in the family Bacillariaceae.
