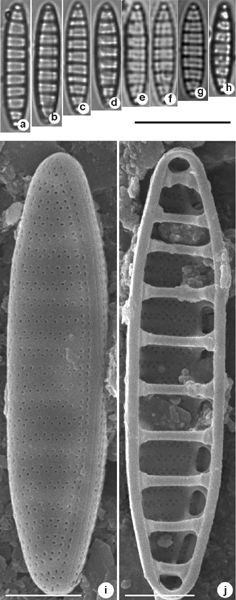
- Denticula rainierensis

Scientific classification
- Domain: Eukaryota
- Clade: Sar
- Clade: Stramenopiles
- Division: Ochrophyta
- Clade: Bacillariophyta
- Class: Bacillariophyceae
- Order: Bacillariales
- Family: Bacillariaceae
- Genus: Denticula; Kütz., 1844

Species
- Denticula dusenii Cleve, 1894; Denticula elegans Kützing, 1844; Denticula eximia Krammer & Lange-Bertalot, 1987; Denticula inflata W.Smith, 1856; Denticula kuetzingii Grunow, 1862; Denticula kutzingii; Denticula mesolepta (Grunow) Meister, 1932; Denticula neritica R.W.Holmes & D.A.Croll, 1984; Denticula rainerensis Sovereign, 1963; Denticula subtilis Grunow, 1862; Denticula tenuis Kützing, 1844; Denticula thermalis Kützing, 1844; Denticula thermaloides B.van de Vijver & C.Cocquyt, 2009; Denticula valida (Pedicino) Grunow, 1882-1885; Denticula vallus (Nikolaev) M.J.Sullivan, 2010; Denticula vanheurckii

= Denticula =

Genus of single-celled organisms

Denticula is a genus of diatoms in the family Bacillariaceae.
