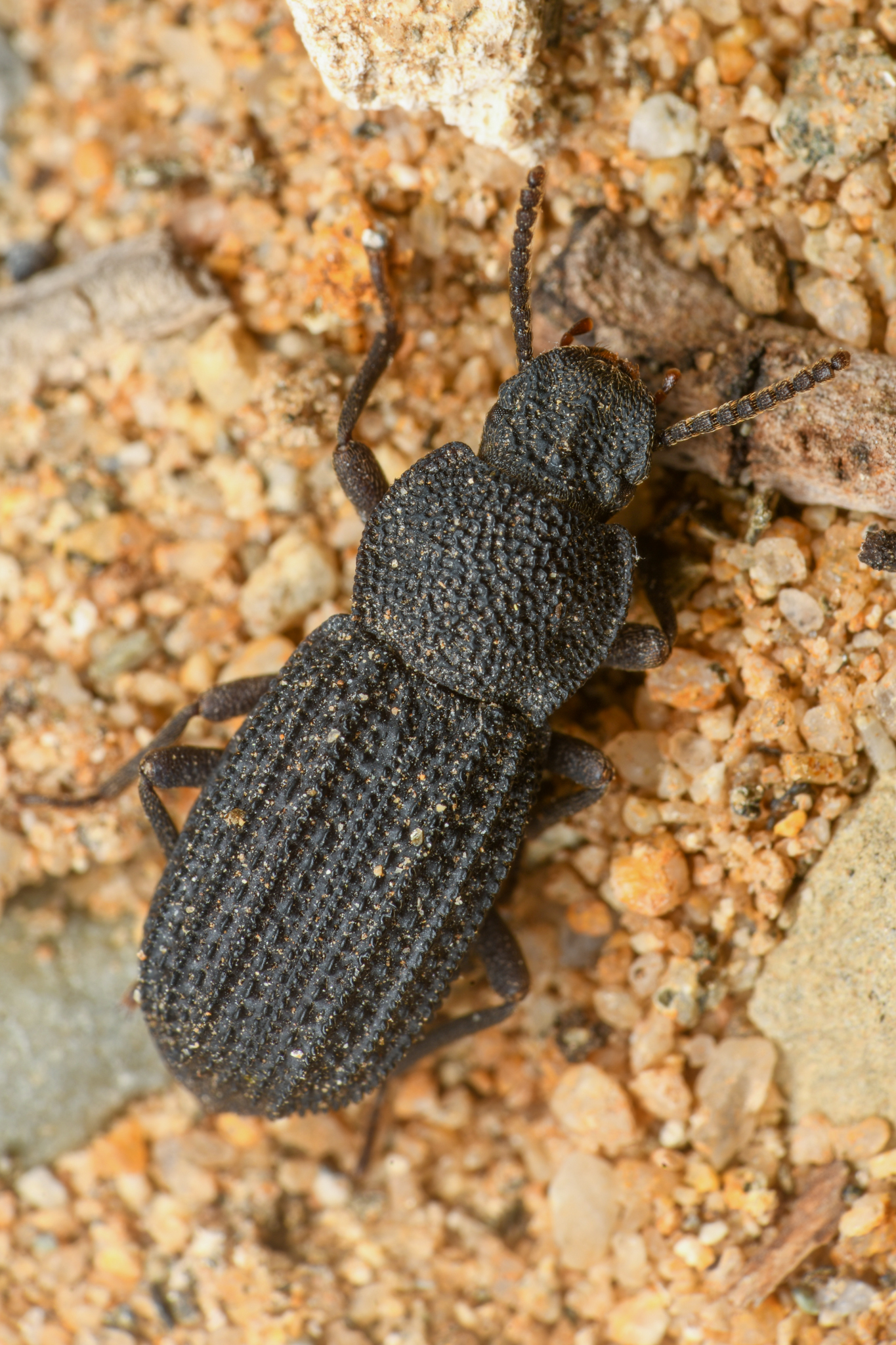

Scientific classification
- Domain: Eukaryota
- Kingdom: Animalia
- Phylum: Arthropoda
- Class: Insecta
- Order: Coleoptera
- Suborder: Polyphaga
- Infraorder: Cucujiformia
- Family: Tenebrionidae
- Genus: Nyctoporis
- Species: N. carinata

Binomial name
- Nyctoporis carinata LeConte, 1851

= Nyctoporis carinata =

Species of beetle

Nyctoporis carinata, also known as the armored night-walker and the flightless darkling beetle, is a species of beetle native to California along the coast and the Coast Ranges.

Adult Nyctoporis carinata reach 12–16 millimetres (0.47–0.63 in) in length. They are black and covered in indentations, bumps, and ridges. Golden hairs are attached to their feet, or tarsi. Because their wing covers are fused, they are flightless. They are found in leaf litter and rocky debris.

Preliminary genetic analysis suggests that Nyctoporis carinata and Nyctoporis vandykei may in fact be synonymous species.

== See also ==
- Diabolical ironclad beetle
