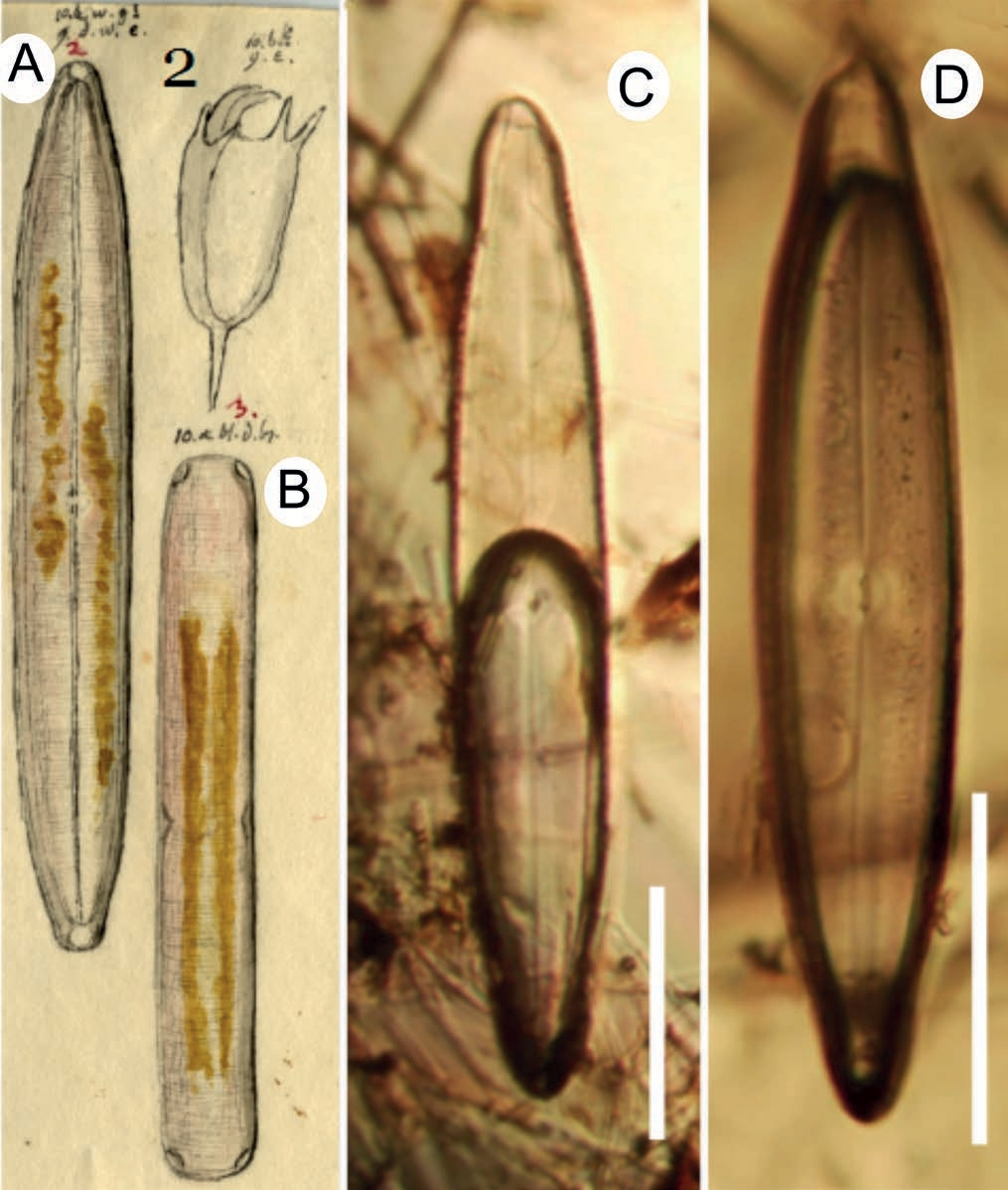
- Neidium iridis

Scientific classification
- Domain: Eukaryota
- Clade: Diaphoretickes
- Clade: SAR
- Clade: Stramenopiles
- Phylum: Gyrista
- Subphylum: Ochrophytina
- Class: Bacillariophyceae
- Order: Naviculales
- Family: Neidiaceae
- Genus: Neidium; E.Pfitzer, 1871

= Neidium =

Genus of diatoms

Neidium is a genus of diatoms belonging to the family Neidiaceae.

The genus has cosmopolitan distribution.

Species:

- Neidium acutum Z.Levkov & S.Krstic, 2007
- Neidium affine (Ehrenberg) Pfizer, 1871
- Neidium agonaense Foged, 1966
