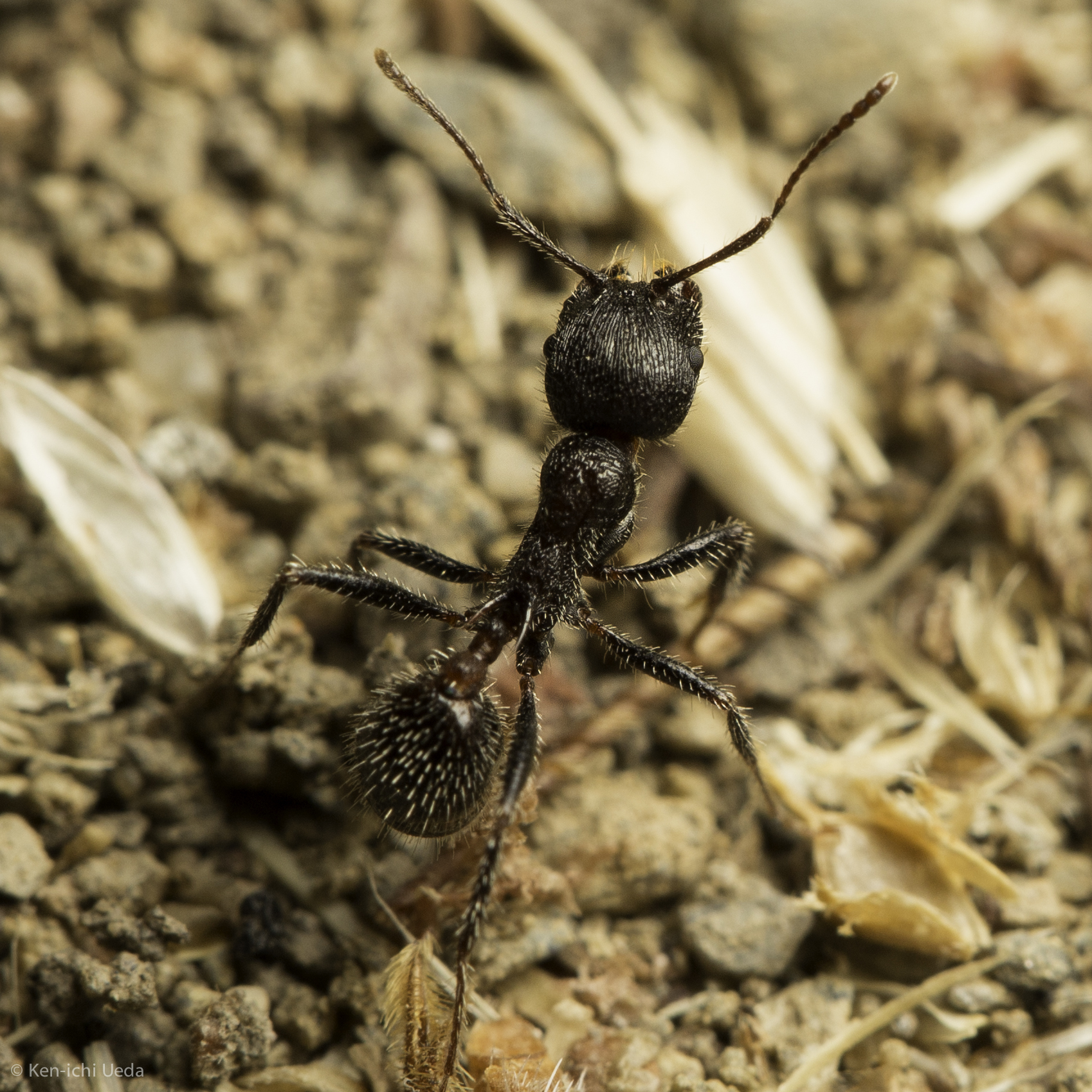

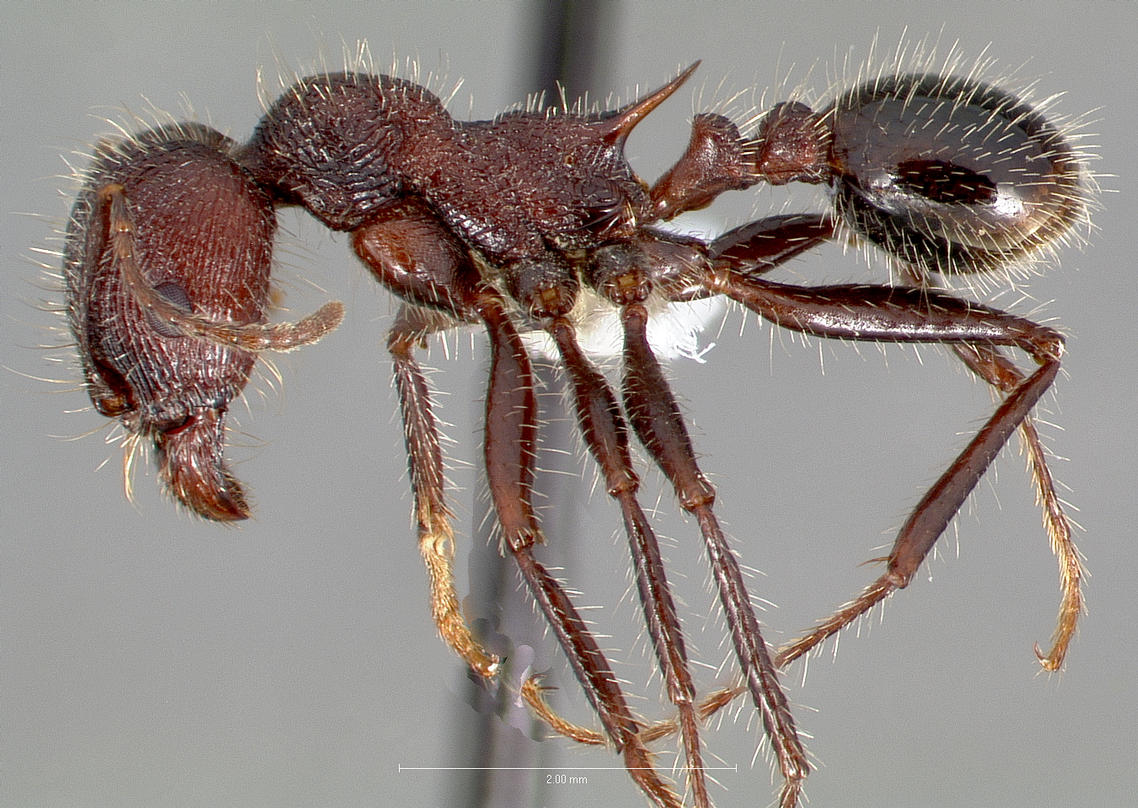

Scientific classification
- Domain: Eukaryota
- Kingdom: Animalia
- Phylum: Arthropoda
- Class: Insecta
- Order: Hymenoptera
- Family: Formicidae
- Subfamily: Myrmicinae
- Genus: Veromessor
- Species: V. andrei

Binomial name
- Veromessor andrei Wheeler, W.M. & Creighton, 1934

Synonyms
- Aphaenogaster andrei Mayr, 1886; Stenamma andrei Emery, 1895; Novomessor andrei Emery, 1915; Messor andrei Forel, 1917; Veromessor andrei castaneus Wheeler, W.M. & Creighton, 1934; Veromessor andrei flavus Wheeler, W.M. & Creighton, 1934

= Veromessor andrei =

Species of ant

Veromessor andrei is a species of harvester ant native to California, Oregon, Baja California, and possibly Nevada, Arizona, and Colorado.

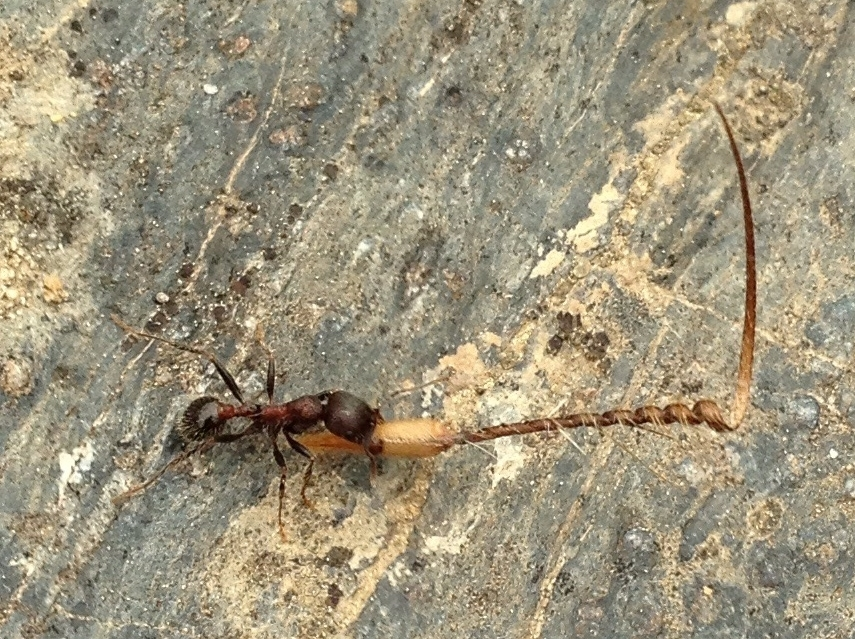
Carrying a stork's-bill seed
