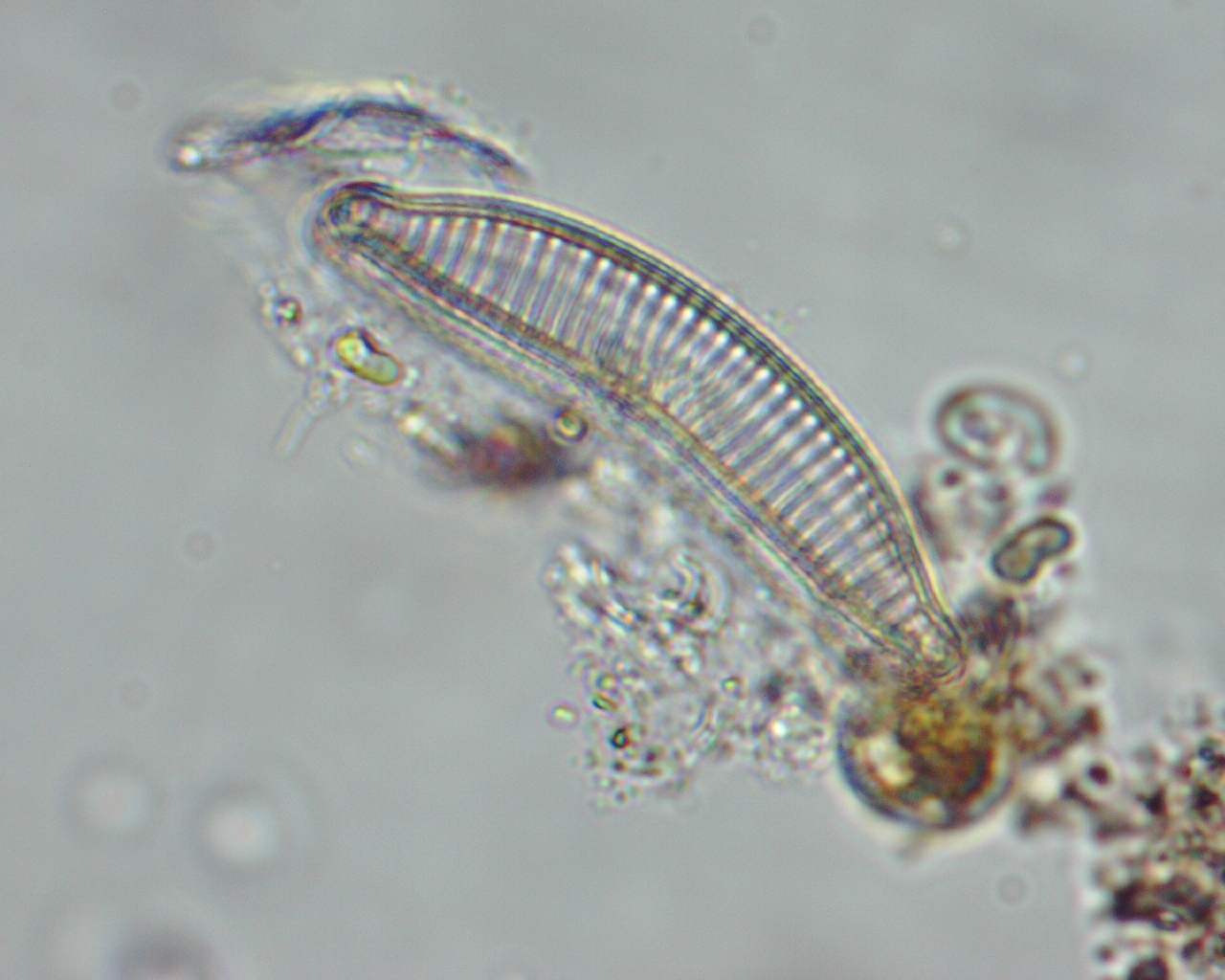

Scientific classification
- Domain: Eukaryota
- Clade: Sar
- Clade: Stramenopiles
- Division: Ochrophyta
- Clade: Bacillariophyta
- Class: Bacillariophyceae
- Order: Surirellales
- Family: Surirellaceae
- Genus: Epithemia
- Species: E. turgida

Binomial name
- Epithemia turgida Kützing, 1844 (Ehrenberg)

= Epithemia turgida =

Species of eukaryote

Epithemia turgida is a species from the genus Epithemia. The species was originally described by Friedrich Traugott Kützing in 1844
