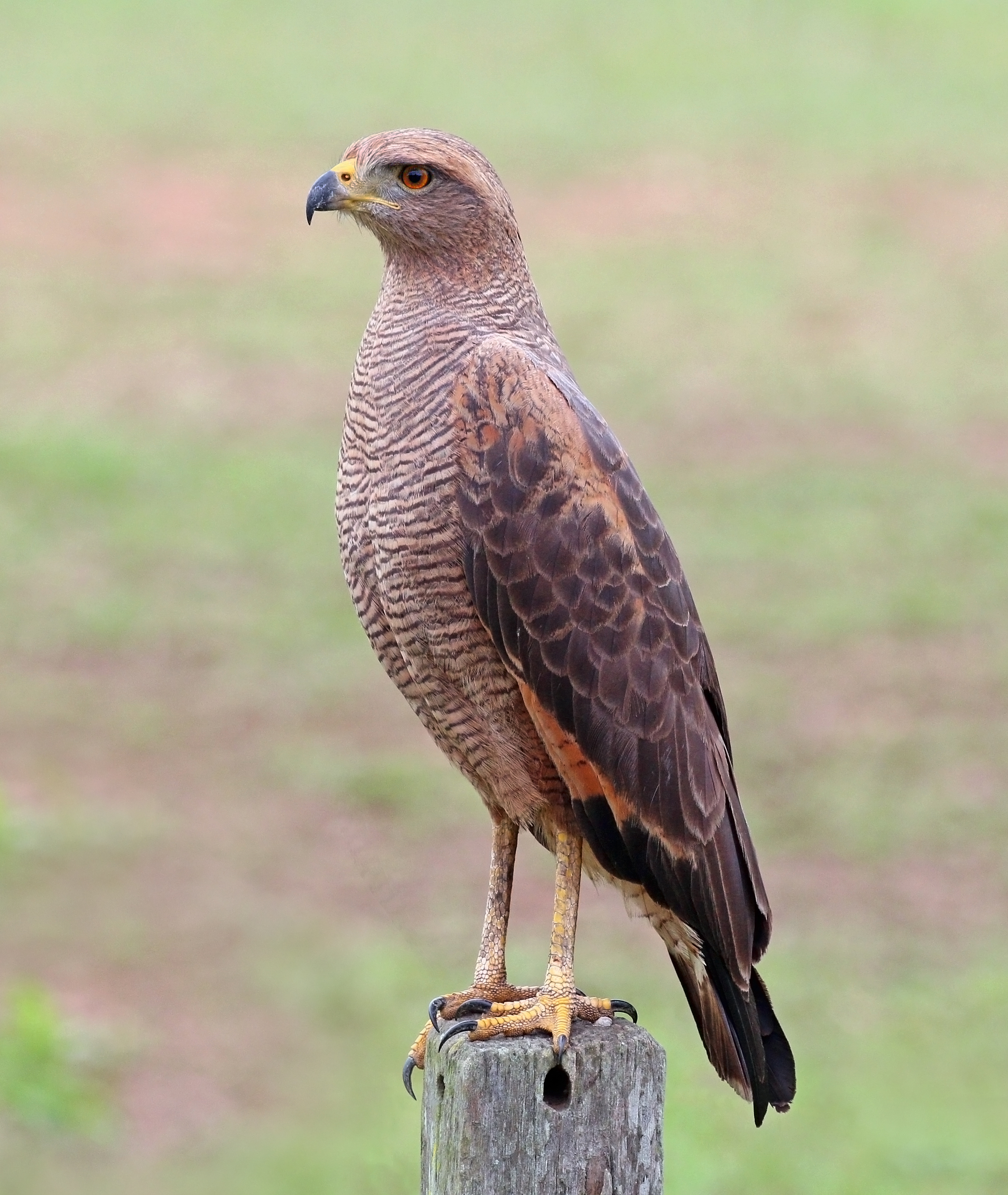
- In the Pantanal, Brazil

Conservation status
- Least Concern (IUCN 3.1)

Scientific classification
- Kingdom: Animalia
- Phylum: Chordata
- Class: Aves
- Order: Accipitriformes
- Family: Accipitridae
- Genus: Buteogallus
- Species: B. meridionalis

Binomial name
- Buteogallus meridionalis (Latham, 1790)

Synonyms
- Heterospizias meridionalis

= Savanna hawk =

Species of bird

The savanna hawk (Buteogallus meridionalis) is a large raptor found in open savanna and swamp edges. It was formerly placed in the genus Heterospizias. It breeds from Panama and Trinidad south to Bolivia, Uruguay and central Argentina. There are also reports of it in California, from 1973 in Alameda County and from 1974 in San Diego County.

== Description ==
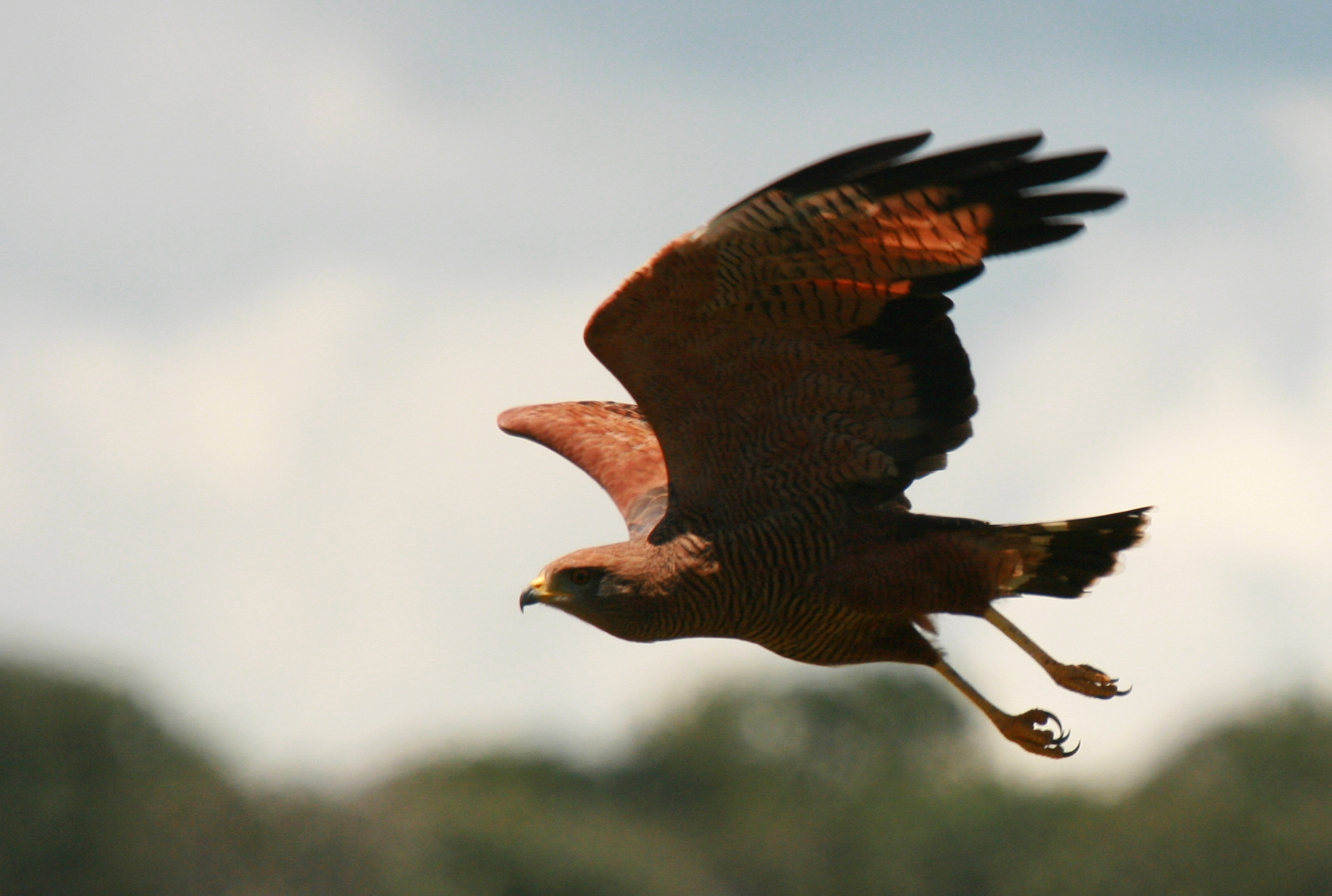
Flying in Goias, Brazil

The savanna hawk is 46–61 cm (18–24 in) in length and weighs 845 g (29.8 oz). The adult has a rufous body with grey mottling above and fine black barring below. The flight feathers of the long broad wings are black, and the tail is banded black and white. The legs are yellow. The call is a loud scream keeeeru.

Immature birds are similar to the adults but have darker, duller upperparts, paler underparts with coarser barring, and a whitish supercilium. This species perches very vertically, and its legs are strikingly long.

== Food and feeding ==
The savanna hawk feeds on small mammals, small birds, lizards, snakes, toads, frogs, eels, other fish, crabs, roots, spiders, and large insects (such as grasshoppers). It usually sits on an open high perch from which it swoops on its prey, but will also hunt on foot, and several birds may gather at grass fires.

== Reproduction ==
The nest is of sticks lined with grass and built in a palm tree. The clutch is a single white egg, and the young take 6.5 to 7.5 weeks to fledging.
