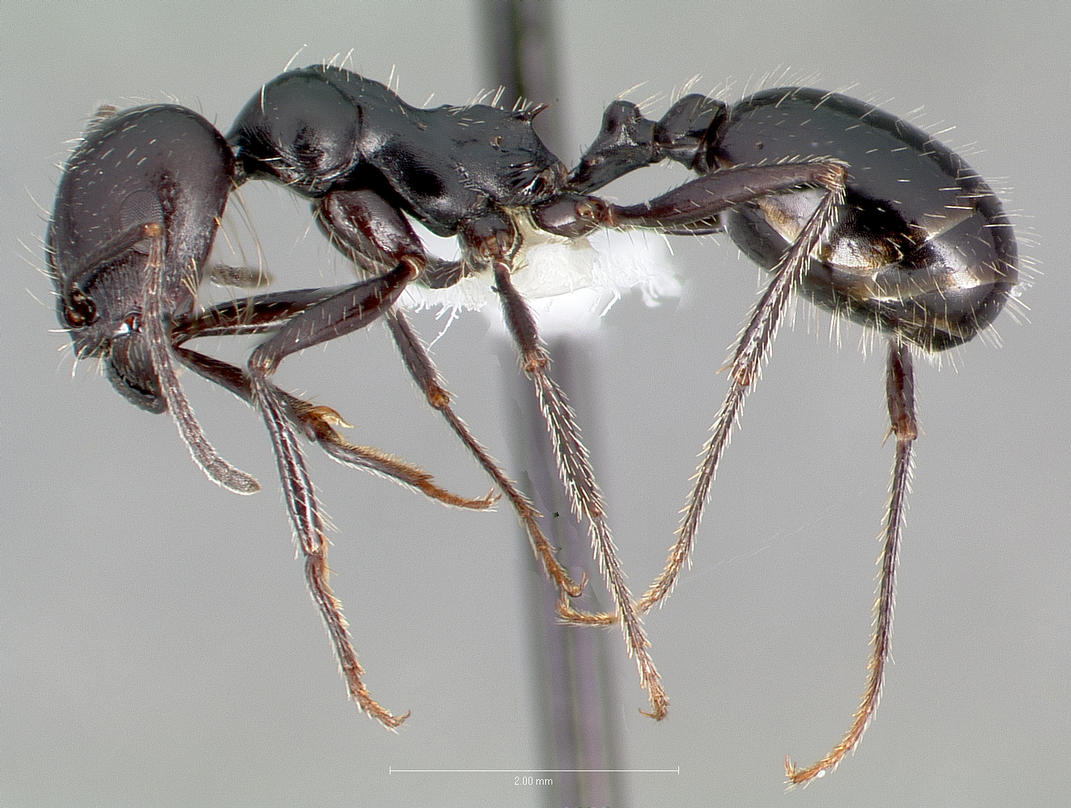
- V. pergandei worker from the United States

Scientific classification
- Kingdom: Animalia
- Phylum: Arthropoda
- Class: Insecta
- Order: Hymenoptera
- Family: Formicidae
- Subfamily: Myrmicinae
- Genus: Veromessor
- Species: V. pergandei

Binomial name
- Veromessor pergandei (Mayr, 1886)

= Veromessor pergandei =

Species of ant

Veromessor pergandei is a species of harvester ant native to the Southwestern United States, especially the deserts of southeastern California. It has also been identified in the Baja California peninsula of Mexico. It was first described by Gustav Mayr, who named it Aphaenogaster pergandei. It can also be referred to as a black harvester ant or desert harvester ant, although these common names have also been applied to other species.

== Description ==
V. pergandei has a head of equal length and width, with very large mandibles. It has short white or yellow hair and a large thorax. Males typically measure about 8.5 mm (0.33 in) and females about 10 mm (0.39 in). However, individual size can vary based on factors such as availability of food and interspecific competition. The species is named after American myrmecologist Theodore Pergande. The genus was for some time synonymized under Messor but has been split out based on a 2015 study.

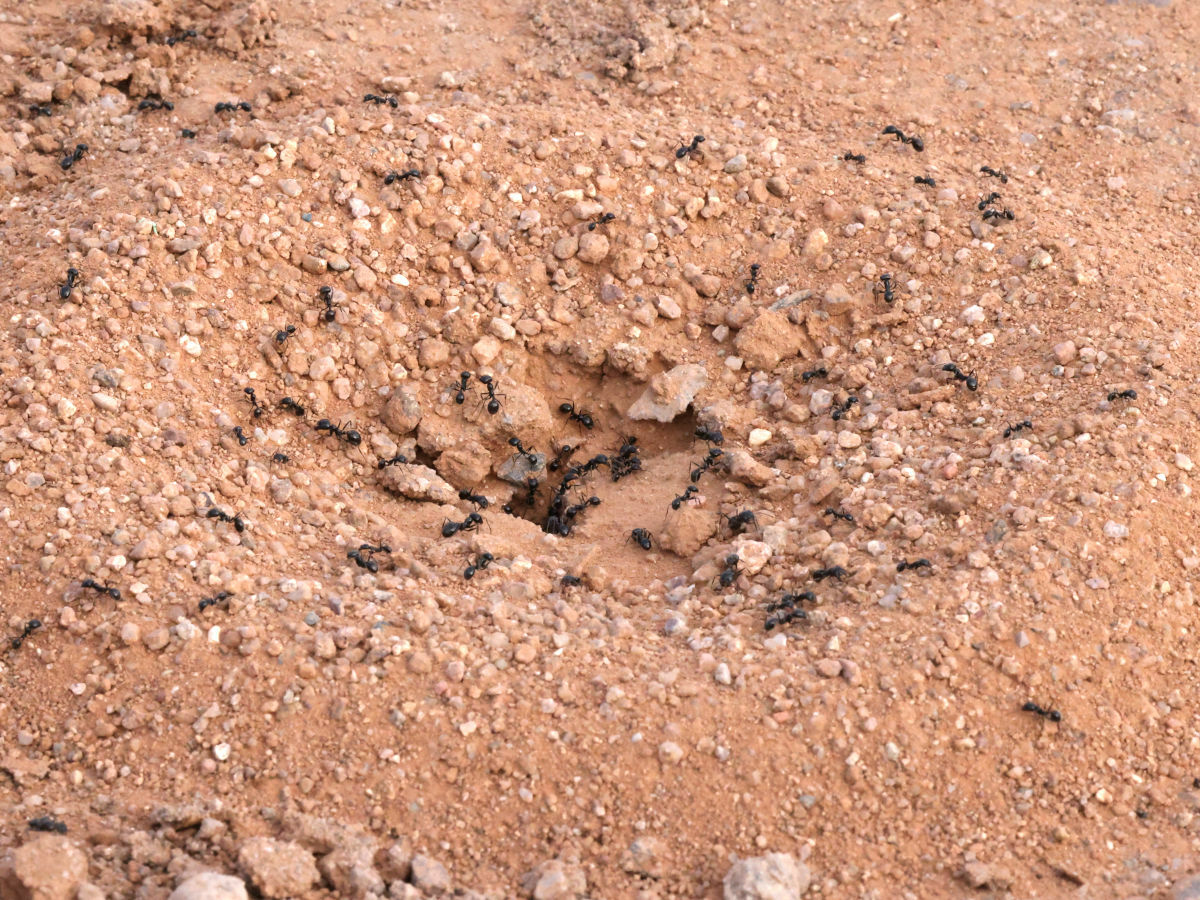
nest mound

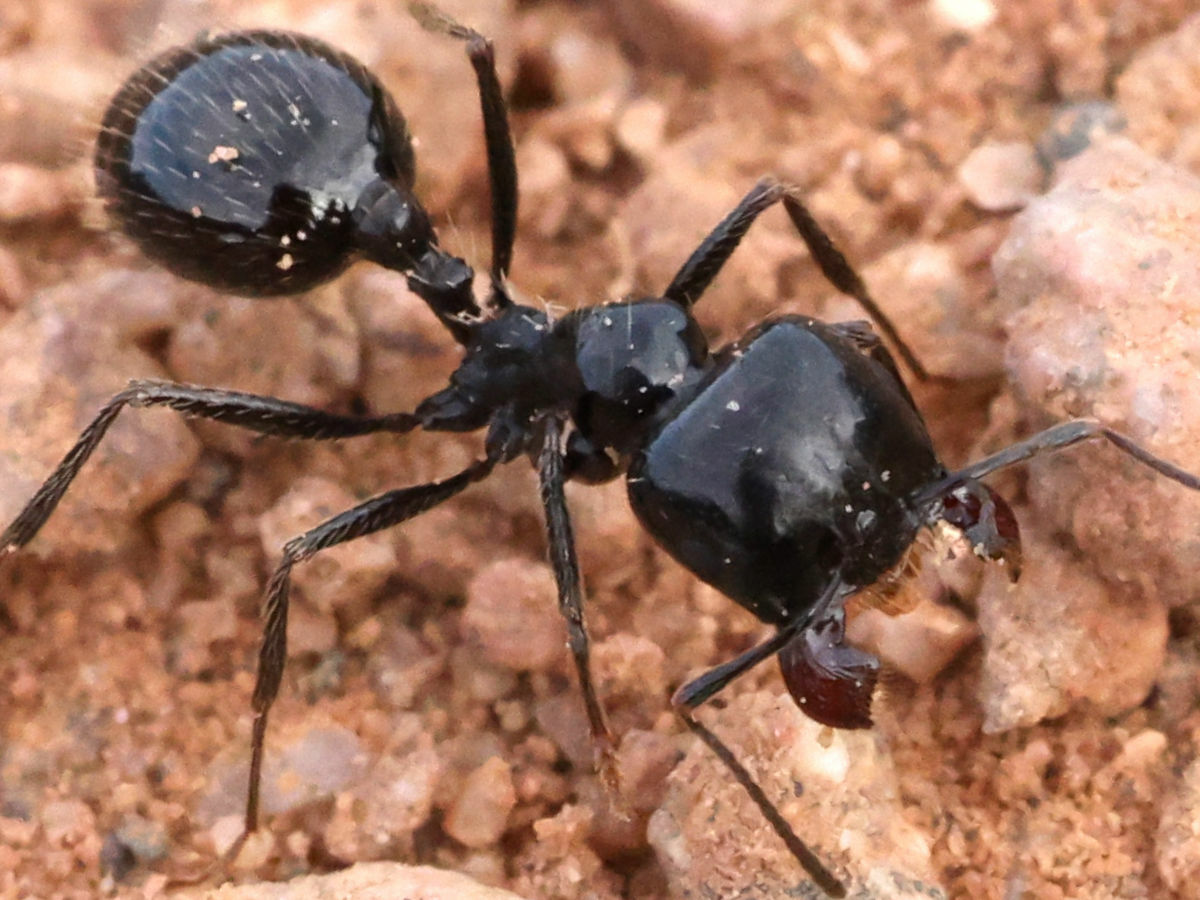
worker

== Ecology ==
Like other harvester ants, V. pergandei gathers fruits and seeds for food. The seeds of perennial shrubs such as Larrea tridentata and Ambrosia dumosa are included in its diet.
