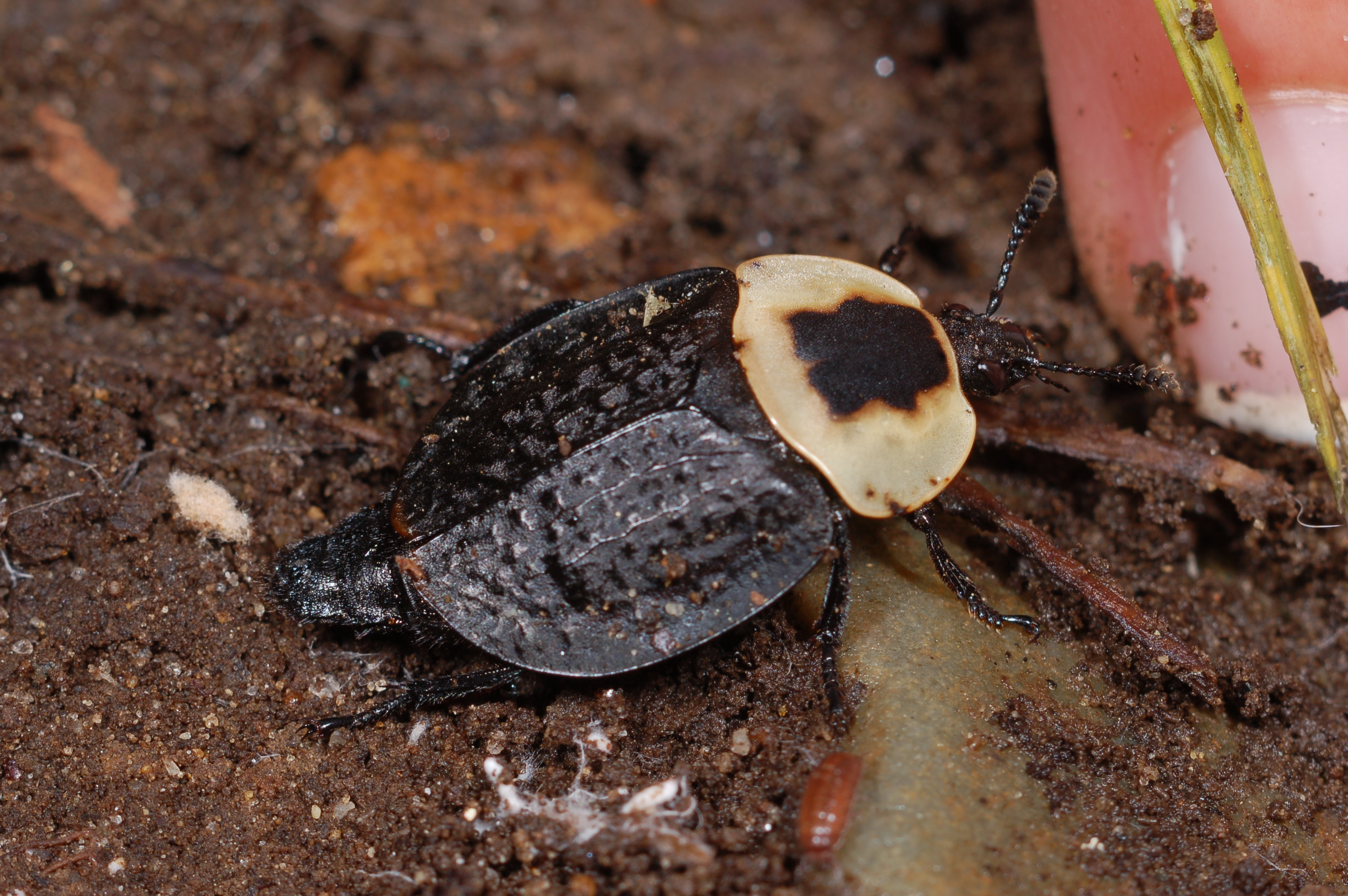

Scientific classification
- Kingdom: Animalia
- Phylum: Arthropoda
- Clade: Pancrustacea
- Class: Insecta
- Order: Coleoptera
- Suborder: Polyphaga
- Infraorder: Staphyliniformia
- Family: Staphylinidae
- Genus: Necrophila
- Species: N. americana

Binomial name
- Necrophila americana (Linnaeus, 1758)

Synonyms
- Silpha americana Linnaeus, 1758; Necrophilia americana Linnaeus, 1758

= American carrion beetle =

Species of beetle

The American carrion beetle (Necrophila americana, formerly Silpha americana) is a North American beetle of the family Silphidae. It lays its eggs in, and its larvae consume, raw flesh (particularly that of dead animals) and fungi. The larvae and adults also consume fly larvae and the larvae of other carrion beetles that compete for the same food sources as their larvae. They prefer to live in marshy and woody habitats. Necrophila americana emerge from their larval state in the early summer. A cuckoo bumble bee, Bombus ashtoni, displays close mimicry with the American carrion beetle. They are important in forensic studies because of their tendency to thrive on large carcasses.

== Appearance ==
Necrophila americana are distinctive in that they have a relatively large, broadly rounded, and flattened body with a yellow pronotum. It is the only North American silphid with a mostly yellow pronotum, and it is the only species of Necrophila found in North America, as all other species are found in Asia. There is sexual dimorphism, with the males having rounded elytral apices and females having their apices more prolonged. They typically range from 12 to 22 millimeters long. The larvae can be characterized by their black color, two-segmented urogomphi, and the presence of numerous plates on the sensory area of the second antennal segment.

== Range ==
The beetle lives in North America, east of the Rocky Mountains. Its southern boundary is from eastern Texas to Florida and the northern boundary is from Minnesota to southeastern Canada, including New Brunswick and Maine.

== Habitat ==
Dense populations of N. americana have been found in eastern parts of Kansas. Over half of the 140 specimens collected (65%) were reported to be found in wooded areas, while 25% were found in marginal areas of woods. They are often found in open fields, while being rarely found in open meadows. However, it has also been shown that in habitats with trees present, the beetles prefer habitats that are humid and overgrown with thick trees, as opposed to the meadows or fields.

Other studies have shown that the American carrion beetle also reside in Typha marsh habitats, with lots of water accumulation and heavy rainfall. They prefer marshes over woody areas such as forests, but still prefer both of these habitats over open meadows, which they are rarely found in.

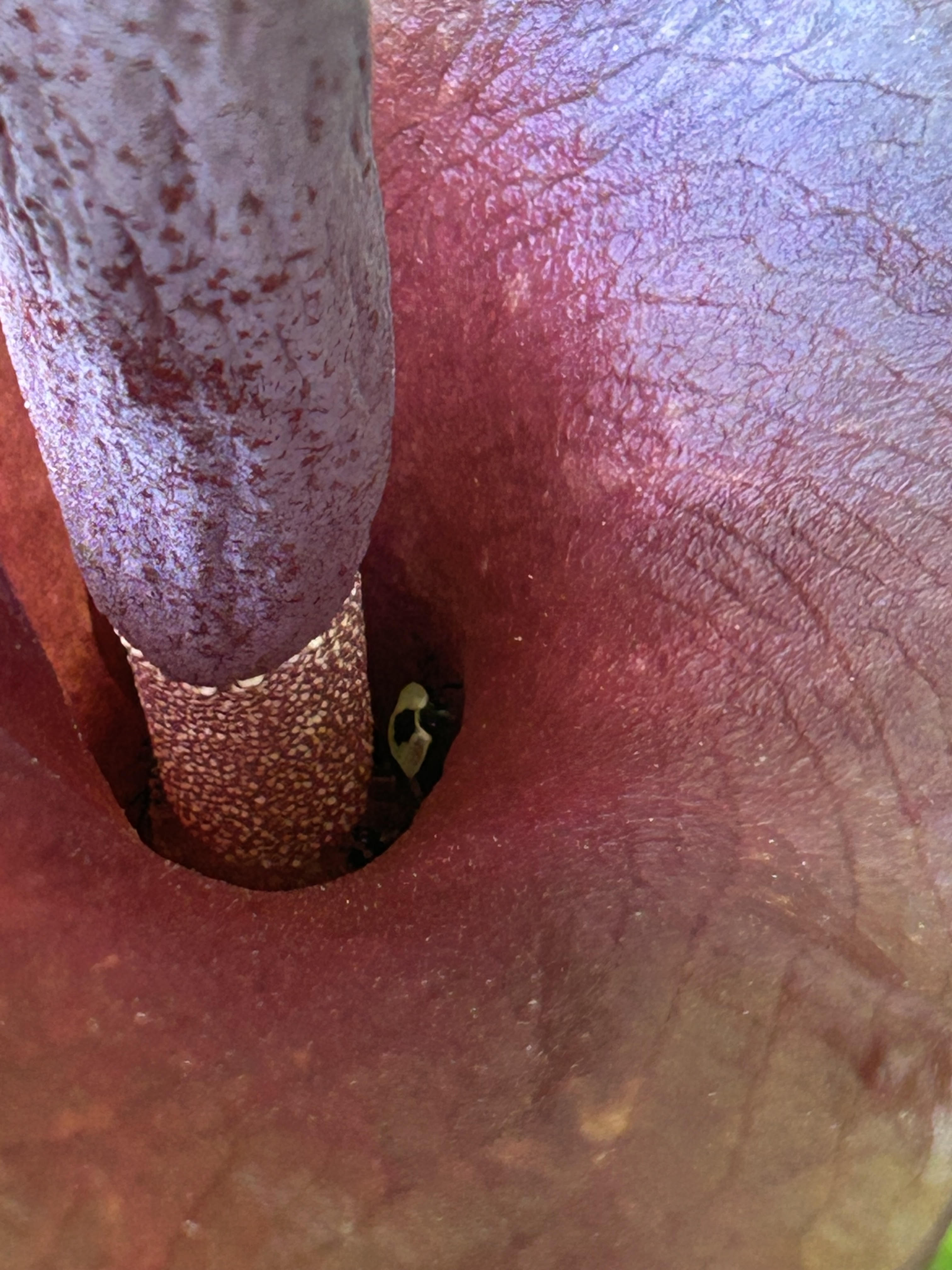
American Carrion beetle inside of the flower of the decay scented Voodoo Lily

== Food resources ==
As adults, N. americana can be captured using carcass bait in a pitfall trap. Their appearance has also been documented in a studied site in Indiana multiple times, and they have appeared consistently as their abundance has aligned.

They can also be baited using pitfall traps containing isopropanol. While the traps attract other insects, it is possible that these traps simply attract carrion beetles by the volatiles produced by carcasses of other insects. However, this is an unlikely explanation. Rather, isopropanol likely acts as a kairomone since there is no differentiation between the preference from females and males. It is possible that isopropanol is perceived as a chemical produced by decomposing bodies during the bloating stage, which would explain why N. americana is attracted to them.

=== Resource partitioning ===
N. americana also practices resource partitioning with other silphids such as Oiceoptoma noveboracense and Thanatophilus lapponicus. These three species are reproductively active at different periods of the year. O. noveboracense is active in the early spring, while T. lapponicus is active late in the summer. This resource partitioning behavior has likely evolved due to limitations in resource availability and must be adapted for rapid reproduction.

American carrion beetles on a dead vole.

== Life cycle ==
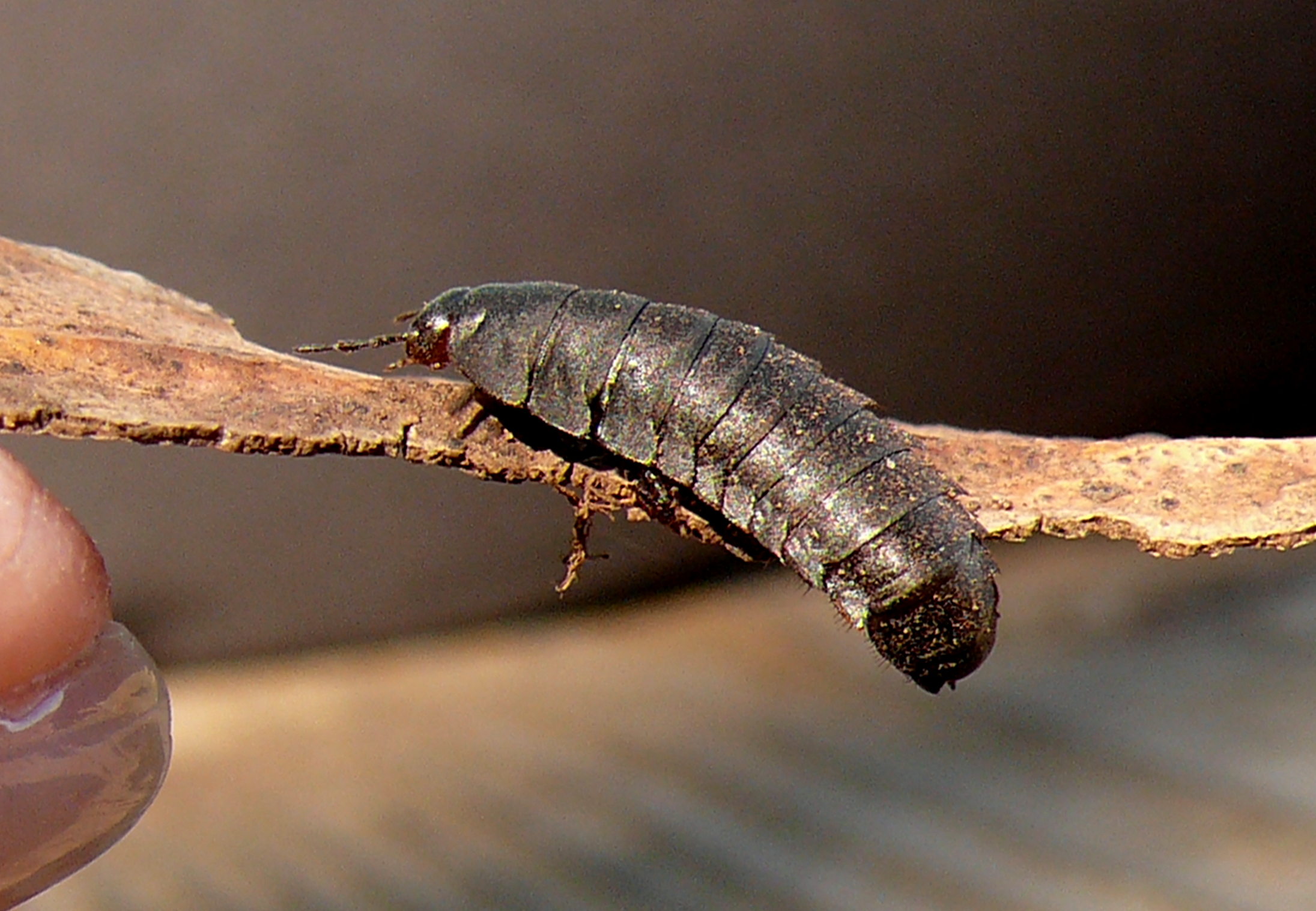
Larva

The American carrion beetle has three instar stages, with differing body measurements at each stage. The first stage has a body length ranging from about 10 to 15 millimeters in length, the second stage ranging from 13 to 21 millimeters in length, and the final stage averaging 23 millimeters in length. The life cycle of the beetle is thought to take around 10 to 12 weeks.

From spring through fall, during daylight, a few hours after flies begin arriving at a carcass, the adult beetles will arrive as well. They immediately begin eating the already hatching fly larvae, mating, and laying their own eggs. As long as the carcass lasts, the adults will remain eating competitors to give their own larvae a chance to eat and grow. Upon hatching from the eggs, the larvae will eat both the carcass and other larvae that are within it. The fly larvae digest part of the carcass, and the beetle larvae will consume the parts that the fly larvae did not, which typically consists of flesh left on the bones and on the moist inside of the face. Eventually the larvae will fall to the ground, dig into the dirt, and pupate. Adults practice overwintering.

The beetle is a ground-dwelling silphid that emerges from its larval state to feed on carcasses in early summer, as its greatest abundance is from June through October. They arrive early during the decomposition process compared to other beetles, which are most prominent during late August. While they do feed on carcasses, they don’t exhibit any signs of parental care.

== Protective coloration and behavior ==
=== Mimicry ===
The American carrion beetle displays close mimicry with Psithyrus ashtoni, a cuckoo bumble bee. Both species have a black head, yellow thoracic disk, and a dark pile on their abdomens. The differentiation is that P. ashtoni have less pile on their abdomens. These two species have been confused for each other, with one instance where N. americana was collected instead of P. ashtoni by mistake. There are also other species of carrion beetle that mimic other species of bumble bee. Necrophorus investigator is a mimic of Bombus terrestris and B. lucorum in not only visual characteristics, but also sound.

N. americana’s mimicry is not only limited to morphology; both species also emerge early in the year to begin flight, and they have similar flight patterns. N. americana has a zigzag flight pattern when searching for food, while P. ashtoni has a circular flight pattern which is typically slow and leisurely. Both species are also diurnal, flying highest during the day and lower during the night. The most likely explanations for the evolution of this mimicry are that they can avoid the same predators by sharing their pattern of coloration, and that they can use aposematic coloration to warn predators not to consume them.

== Mating ==
=== Mate guarding ===
Some male carrion beetles practice mate guarding, a practice used to increase success from sperm competition. The probability of a beetle guarding is dependent on both the sex ratio and the size of an individual. A larger beetle is more likely to guard than a smaller beetle because smaller beetles require more energy to maintain guarding and are thus unable to compete with larger beetles, so the smaller beetles get little marginal benefit by guarding. In addition, guarding behavior has been observed much more when the sex ratio is male-biased due to increased competition between males. Both of these factors indicate that larger males compete for the largest females and successfully guard them when the ratio is male-biased, which earns the beetle greater paternity and reproductive success compared to smaller males. In equal ratio populations between male and female or female-biased populations, guarding can still be observed, albeit in much lower quantities and for shorter durations. This indicates that males optimize saving energy by guarding as little as possible, but they still expend the necessary energy when intense competition is present.

=== Mating site ===
American carrion beetles are rarely found breeding on dung, but an unusual case of this has been documented. A study examining the different types of beetles found in otter scats documented finding 6 N. americana beetles on 3 separate occasions out of 16 beetles, twice discovered to be breeding on the otter scat. This case is also unusual because these beetles are typically only found on medium or larger carcasses as habitats, while otter dung is small (less than 10 cm^{3}). While breeding, the beetles were observed to be standing over the undigested fish parts (bones and scales) in the dung. The multiple occurrences of breeding observed on the dung indicates that otter dung is a beneficial habitat feature for this species.

== Mutualism ==
The beetle is known to engage in mutualistic phoresis with mites of the genus Poecilochirus. Upon arrival at a carcass, these mites drop from the beetle and begin eating the eggs and larvae of the flies that preceded the beetles (and continue to lay more eggs even as the beetles are active). They will eventually return to the adults and be transported to the next carcass. Some of their young will hitch a ride with the beetles' young upon their emergence from the pupal stage.

== Forensic significance ==
N. americana is significant in forensic analyses due to its unique characteristic of feeding on rotting flesh. In comparison to most other flesh-consuming beetles, N. americana is small and has a longer development period, so it is unable to compete with other beetles for superior flesh territories. Thus, it is not found in carcasses in suitcases, which is a superior habitat due to the leakage of organic substances that beetles feed on. Suitcases are also a superior habitat due to the corpses being more easily accessible than other habitats. Rather, in the experiments done, the American carrion beetles were found near sealed drums containing corpses. Drums are an inferior habitat due to the corpse being sealed off from any outside beetles, which means the organic substances are not available to them. American carrion beetles were observed to accumulate around the drums, but did not have access to the corpse itself. Predicting these accumulation patterns is especially important for forensic science since these measures can help determine the minimum postmortem interval (PMI) of a sealed corpse from homicides. N. americana also preferentially consume corpses of larger animals such as pigs (from this study), deer, or potentially humans.
