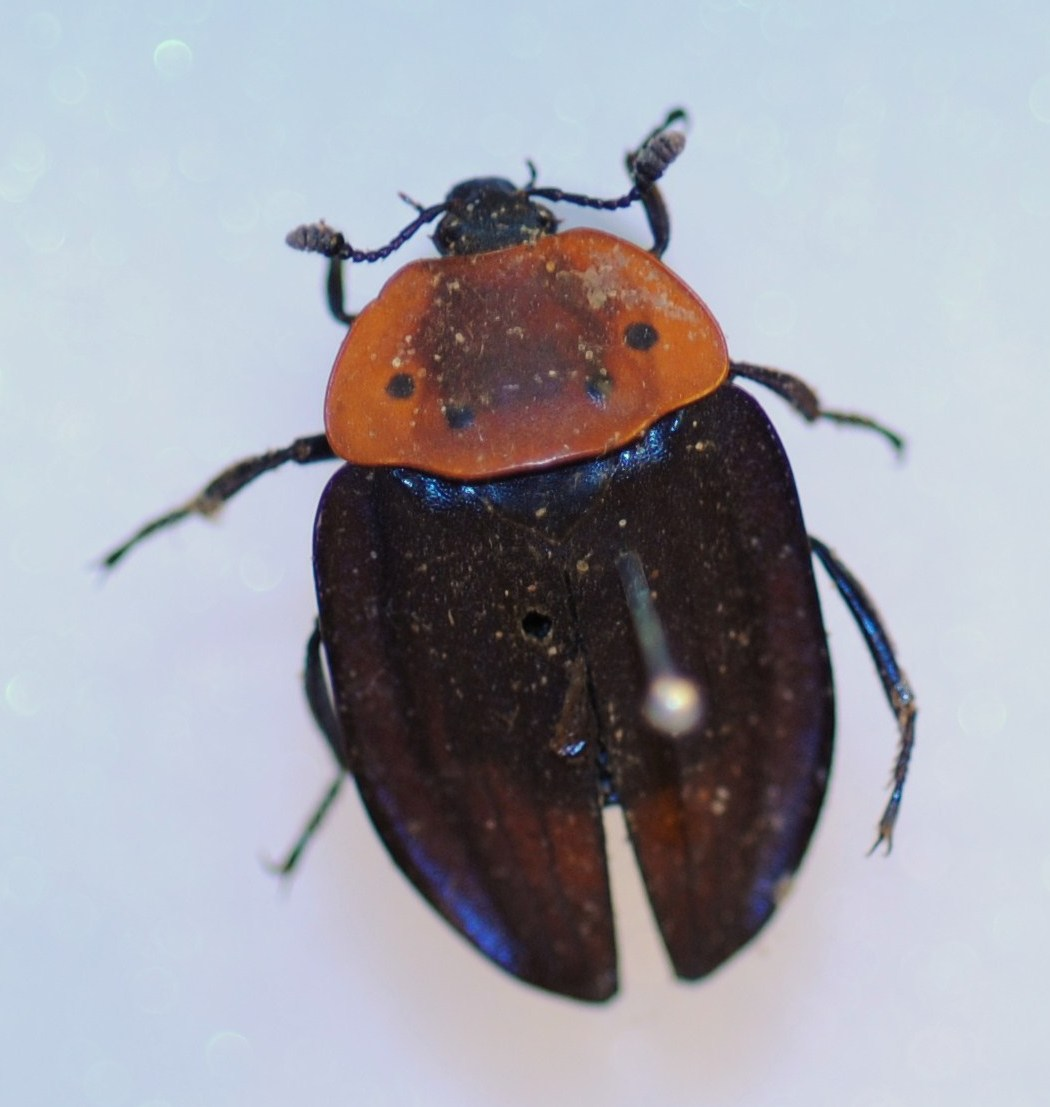

Scientific classification
- Kingdom: Animalia
- Phylum: Arthropoda
- Clade: Pancrustacea
- Class: Insecta
- Order: Coleoptera
- Suborder: Polyphaga
- Infraorder: Staphyliniformia
- Family: Staphylinidae
- Genus: Necrophila
- Species: N. rufithorax

Binomial name
- Necrophila rufithorax (Wiedemann, 1832)

Synonyms
- List: Silpha rufithorax Wiedemann, 1823; Silpha rufithorax Harold 1877; Eusilpha rufithorax Portevin 1903; Eusilpha rufithorax Portevin 1905; Silpha rufithorax Arrow 1909; Eusilpha (Deutosilpha) rufithorax Portevin 1920; Deutosilpha rufithorax Portevin 1926; Silpha (Deuterosilpha) rufithorax Hatch 1928; Oiceoptoma tetraspilotum Hope, 1833; Oiceoptoma tetraspilotum Hope, 1834; Silpha tetraspilota Harold 1877; Eusilpha tetraspilota Portevin 1903; Eusilpha tetraspilota Portevin 1905; Silpha tetraspilota Arrow 1909; Deutosilpha tetraspilota Portevin 1926; Silpha (Deuterosilpha) tetraspilota Hatch 1928

= Necrophila rufithorax =

Species of beetle

Necrophila (Deutosilpha) rufithorax is a species of carrion beetle found in India, Nepal and Sri Lanka. The species is also known to live in Laos and Thailand, but might be another species.

== Description ==
The average body length is about 17.5 to 22.3 mm and the body has a wide and rounded shape from a dorsal view. The pronotum is hexagonal in shape with 4 spots marking it. In males, each elytron is truncated at the apex, but in females, the elytra are elongated, and are convex at the apex.

In India, the beetle was collected in Keoladeo National Park on the semi-dry carcass of mongoose, and on dry soil in a pasture field.
