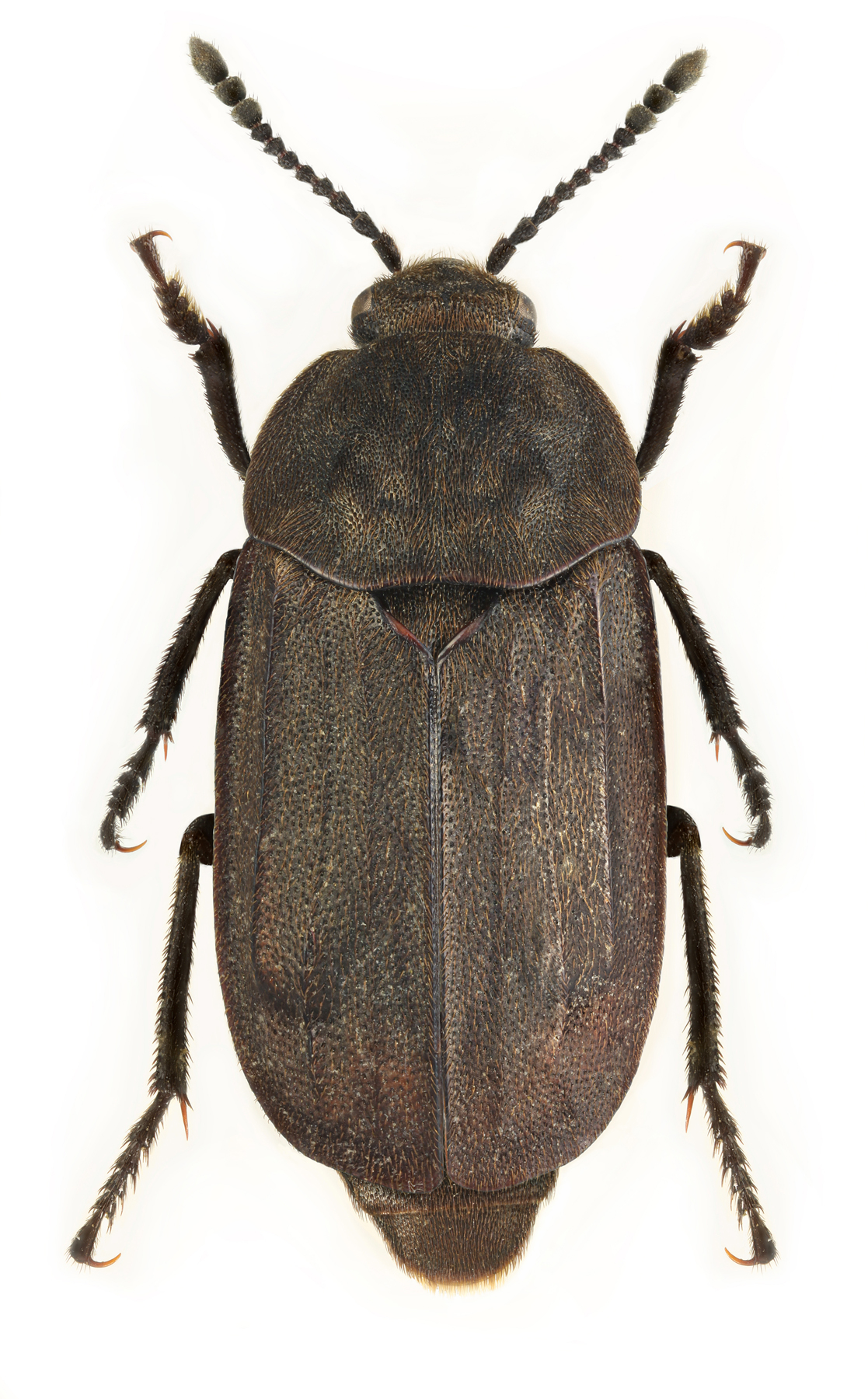

Scientific classification
- Kingdom: Animalia
- Phylum: Arthropoda
- Clade: Pancrustacea
- Class: Insecta
- Order: Coleoptera
- Suborder: Polyphaga
- Infraorder: Staphyliniformia
- Family: Staphylinidae
- Genus: Thanatophilus
- Species: T. trituberculatus

Binomial name
- Thanatophilus trituberculatus (Kirby, 1837)

= Thanatophilus trituberculatus =

Species of beetle

Thanatophilus trituberculatus is a species of carrion beetle in the family Silphidae. It is found in North America and Europe.
