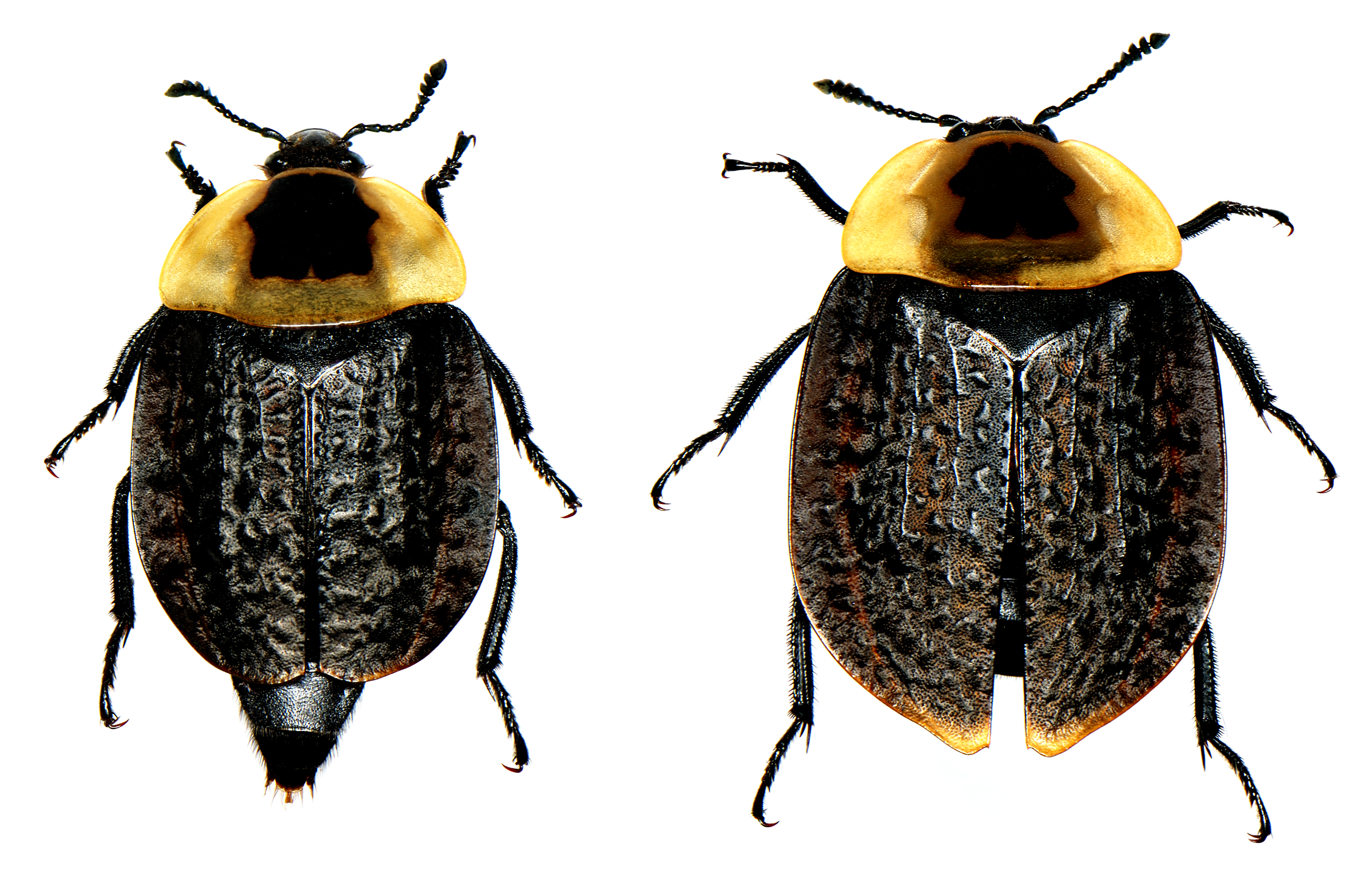
- Necrophila americana male (left) and female
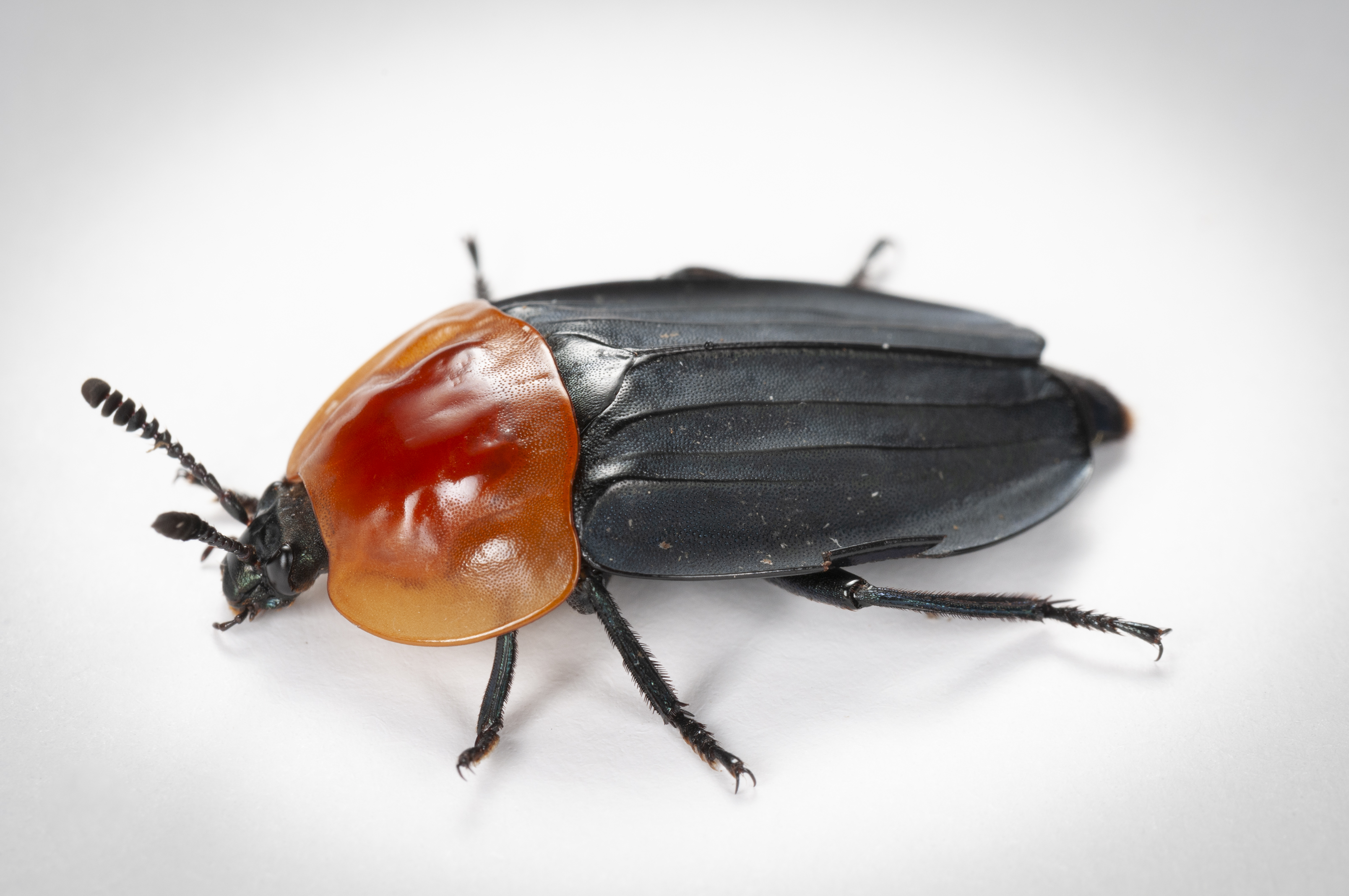
- Necrophila (Calosilpha) brunneicollis brunneicollis, Adult, South Korea

Scientific classification
- Kingdom: Animalia
- Phylum: Arthropoda
- Clade: Pancrustacea
- Class: Insecta
- Order: Coleoptera
- Suborder: Polyphaga
- Infraorder: Staphyliniformia
- Family: Staphylinidae
- Subfamily: Silphinae
- Tribe: Silphini
- Genus: Necrophila; Kirby & Spence 1828

Synonyms
- Necrobora Hope, 1840; Necrotropha Gistel, 1848; Eusilpha Semenov-Tian-Shanskij, 1891; Calosilpha Portevin, 1920; Deutosilpha Portevin, 1920; Chrysosilpha Portevin, 1921; Eosilpha Peck, 2001 (Missp.)

= Necrophila =

Genus of beetles

Necrophila is a genus of carrion beetles, with around 20 species: most found in Asia, and one species in North America, Necrophila americana.

== Species ==
- Necrophila americana
- Necrophila andrewesi
- Necrophila brunnicollis
- Necrophila cyaneocephala
- Necrophila cyaneocincta
- Necrophila cyaniventris
- Necrophila formosa
- Necrophila ioptera
- Necrophila jakowlewi
- Necrophila japonica
- Necrophila luciae
- Necrophila renatae
- Necrophila rufithorax
- Necrophila subcaudata
- Necrophila thibetana
- Necrophila viridis
