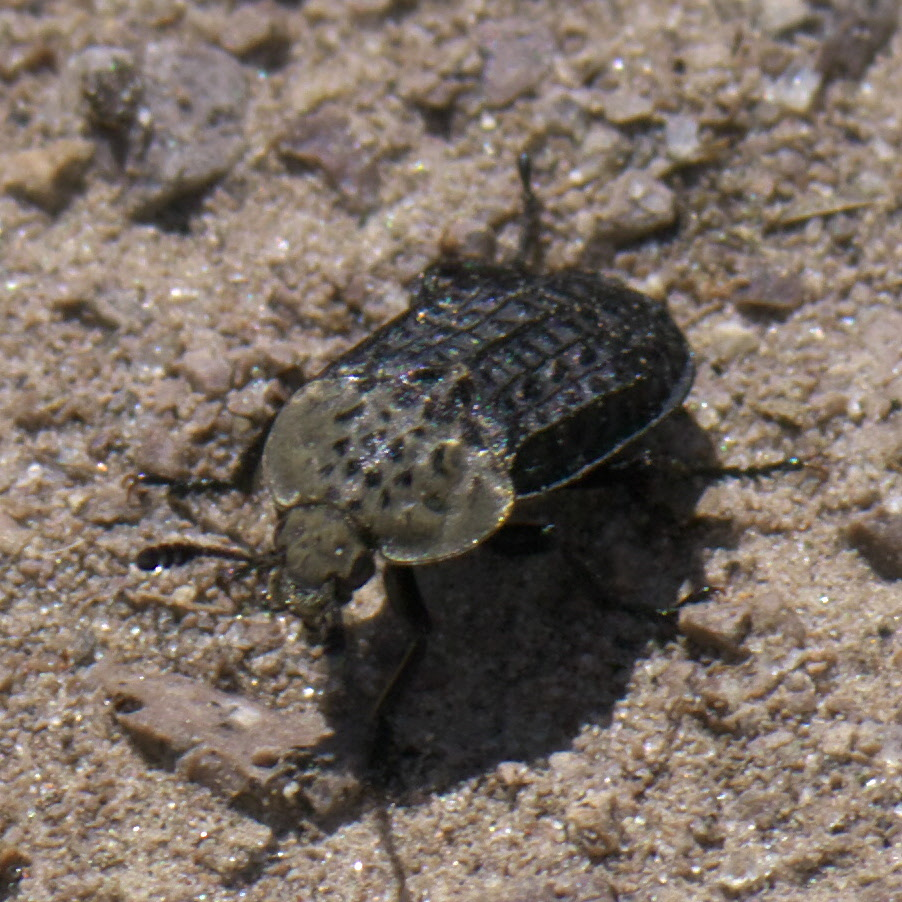
- Thanatophilus lapponicus

Scientific classification
- Kingdom: Animalia
- Phylum: Arthropoda
- Clade: Pancrustacea
- Class: Insecta
- Order: Coleoptera
- Suborder: Polyphaga
- Infraorder: Staphyliniformia
- Family: Staphylinidae
- Tribe: Silphini
- Genus: Thanatophilus; Leach, 1815

= Thanatophilus =

Genus of beetles

Thanatophilus is a genus of carrion beetles in the family Silphidae. There are about 12 described species in Thanatophilus.

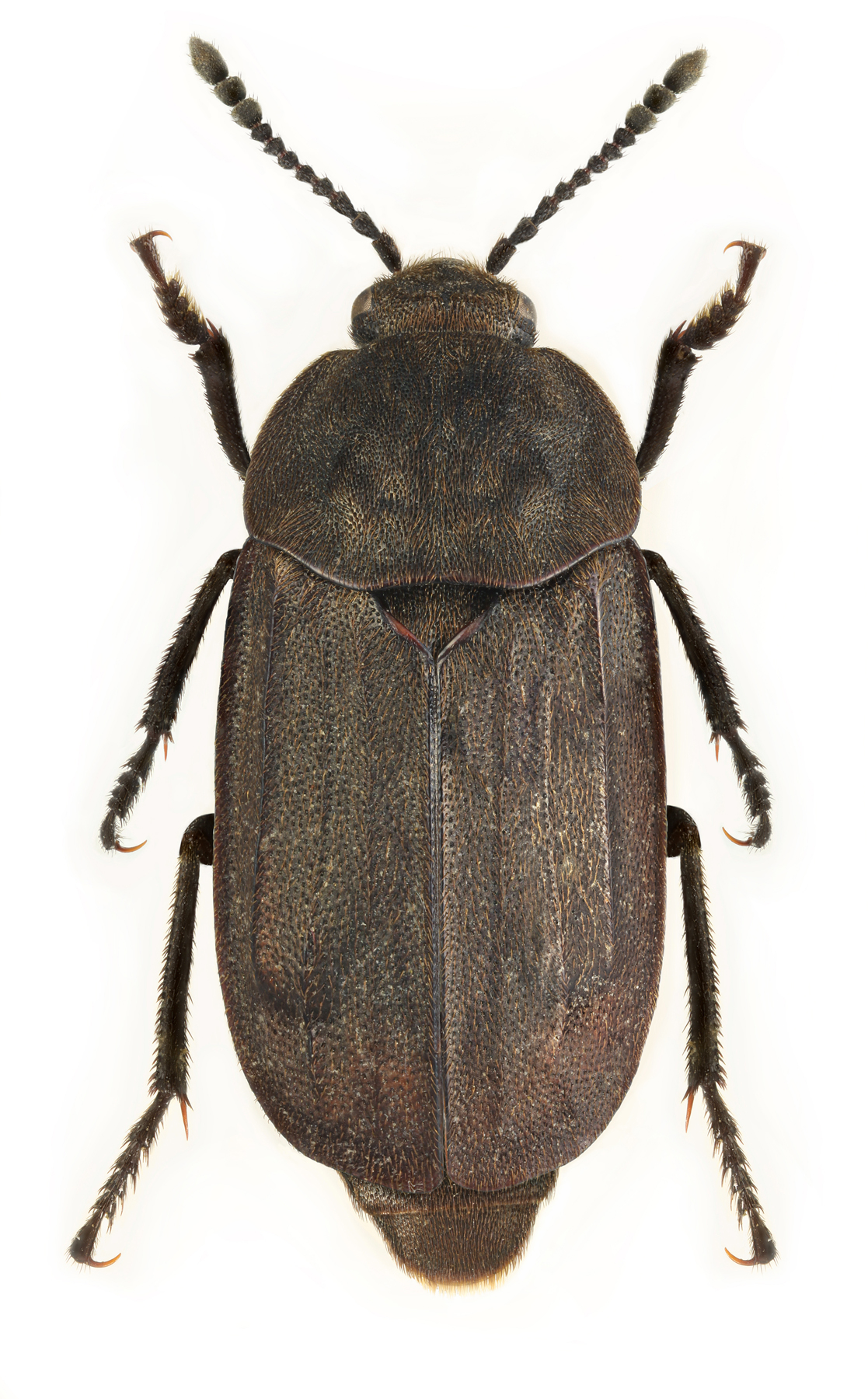
Thanatophilus trituberculatus

== Species ==
These 12 species belong to the genus Thanatophilus:

- Thanatophilus coloradensis (Wickham, 1902)
- Thanatophilus dispar (Herbst, 1793)
- Thanatophilus ferrugatus (Solsky, 1874)
- Thanatophilus lapponicus (Herbst, 1793) (northern carrion beetle)
- Thanatophilus ruficornis (Kuster, 1851)
- Thanatophilus rugosus (Linnaeus, 1758)
- Thanatophilus sagax (Mannerheim, 1853)
- Thanatophilus sinuatus (Fabricius, 1775)
- Thanatophilus terminatus (Hummel, 1825)
- Thanatophilus trituberculatus (Kirby, 1837)
- Thanatophilus truncatus (Say, 1823)
- Thanatophilus uralensis Kozminykh, 1994
