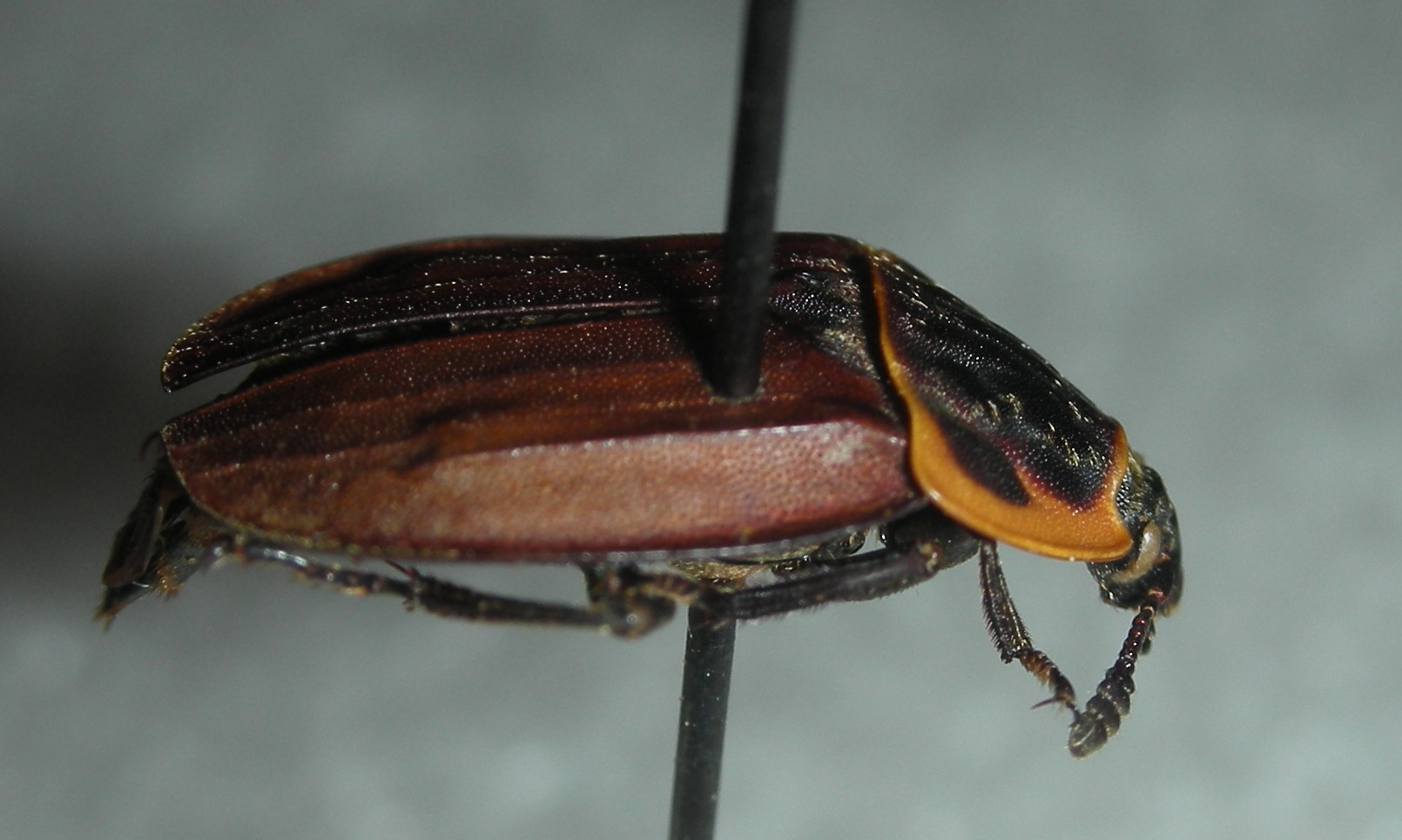
- Oiceoptoma noveboracense

Scientific classification
- Kingdom: Animalia
- Phylum: Arthropoda
- Clade: Pancrustacea
- Class: Insecta
- Order: Coleoptera
- Suborder: Polyphaga
- Infraorder: Staphyliniformia
- Family: Staphylinidae
- Subfamily: Silphinae
- Genus: Oiceoptoma

= Oiceoptoma =

Genus of beetles

Oiceoptoma is a genus of carrion beetles.

== Species ==
- Oiceoptoma hypocritum
- Oiceoptoma inaequale
- Oiceoptoma nakabayashii
- Oiceoptoma nigropunctatum
- Oiceoptoma noveboracense
- Oiceoptoma picescens
- Oiceoptoma rugulosum
- Oiceoptoma subrufum
- Oiceoptoma tangi
- Oiceoptoma thoracicum
