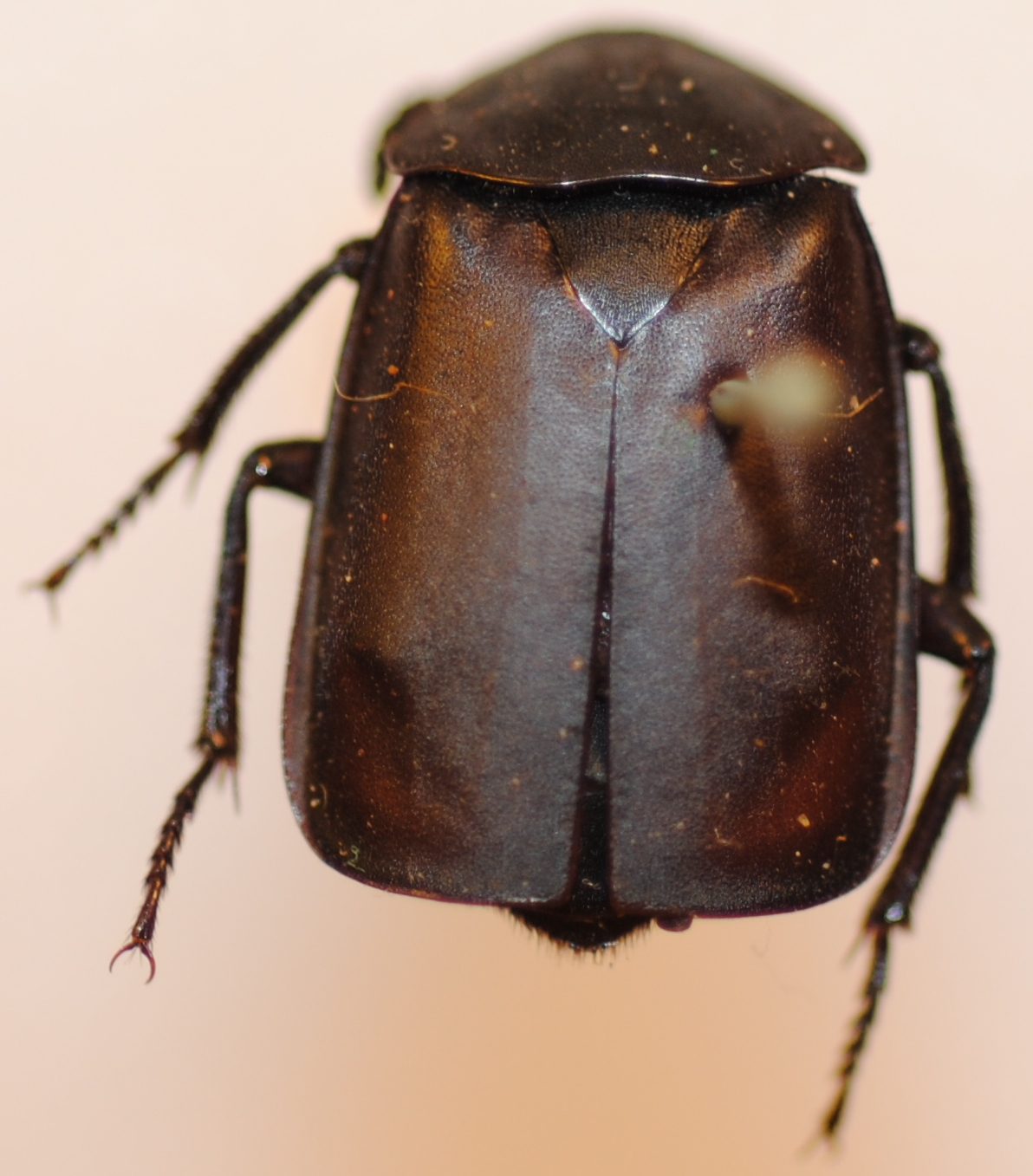
- Thanatophilus truncatus

Scientific classification
- Kingdom: Animalia
- Phylum: Arthropoda
- Clade: Pancrustacea
- Class: Insecta
- Order: Coleoptera
- Suborder: Polyphaga
- Infraorder: Staphyliniformia
- Family: Staphylinidae
- Genus: Thanatophilus
- Species: T. truncatus

Binomial name
- Thanatophilus truncatus (Say, 1823)

= Thanatophilus truncatus =

Species of beetle

Thanatophilus truncatus is a species of carrion beetle in the family Silphidae. It is found in Central America and North America.
