= Thanatophilus sagax =

Scientific classification
- Kingdom: Animalia
- Phylum: Arthropoda
- Clade: Pancrustacea
- Class: Insecta
- Order: Coleoptera
- Suborder: Polyphaga
- Infraorder: Staphyliniformia
- Family: Staphylinidae
- Genus: Thanatophilus
- Species: T. sagax

Binomial name
- Thanatophilus sagax (Mannerheim, 1853)

Species of beetle

Thanatophilus sagax is a species of carrion beetle in the family Silphidae. It is found in North America.
