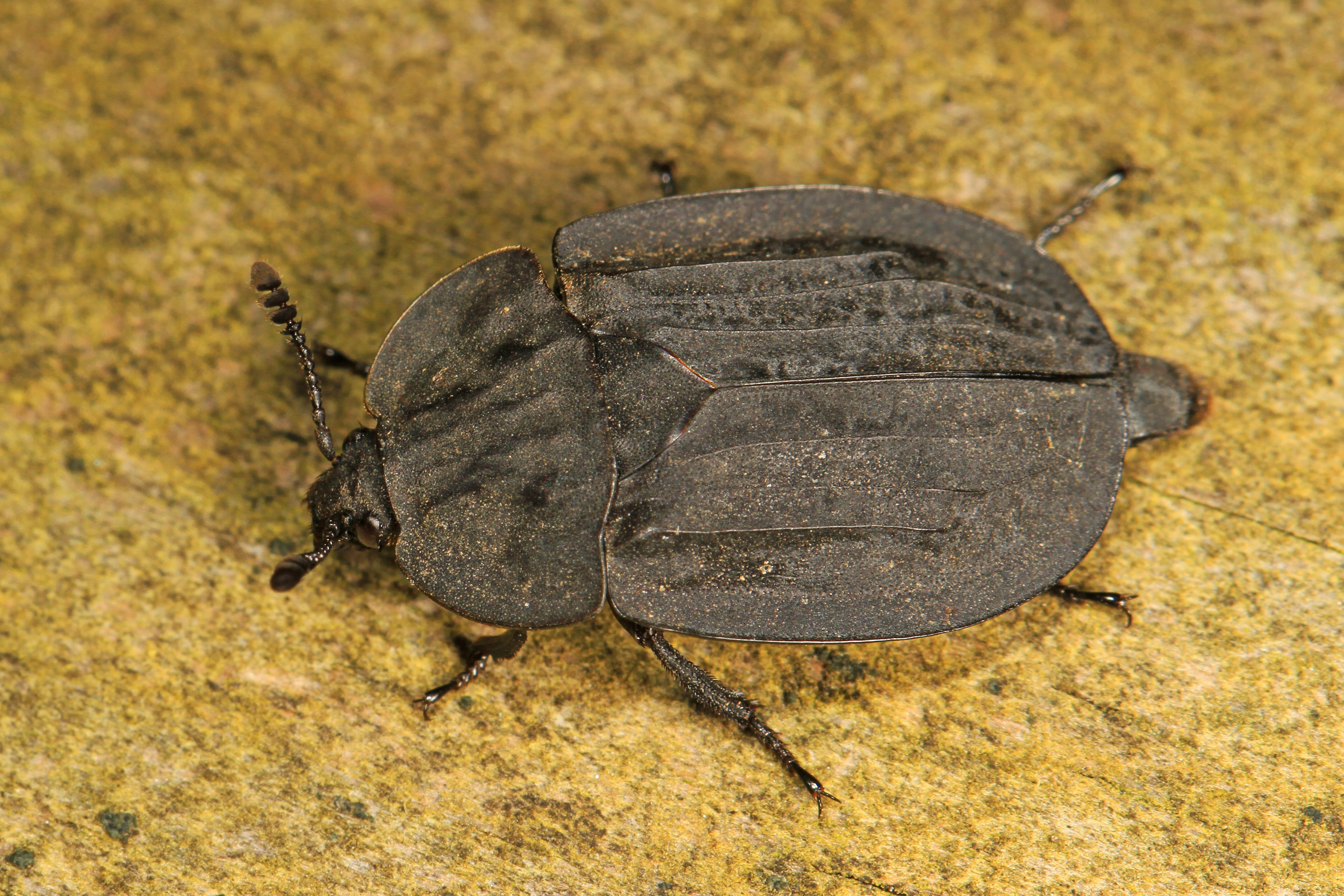

Scientific classification
- Kingdom: Animalia
- Phylum: Arthropoda
- Clade: Pancrustacea
- Class: Insecta
- Order: Coleoptera
- Suborder: Polyphaga
- Infraorder: Staphyliniformia
- Family: Staphylinidae
- Genus: Oiceoptoma
- Species: O. inaequale

Binomial name
- Oiceoptoma inaequale (Fabricius, 1781)

= Oiceoptoma inaequale =

Species of beetle

Oiceoptoma inaequale, the ridged carrion beetle, is a species of carrion beetle in the family Silphidae. It is found in North America.

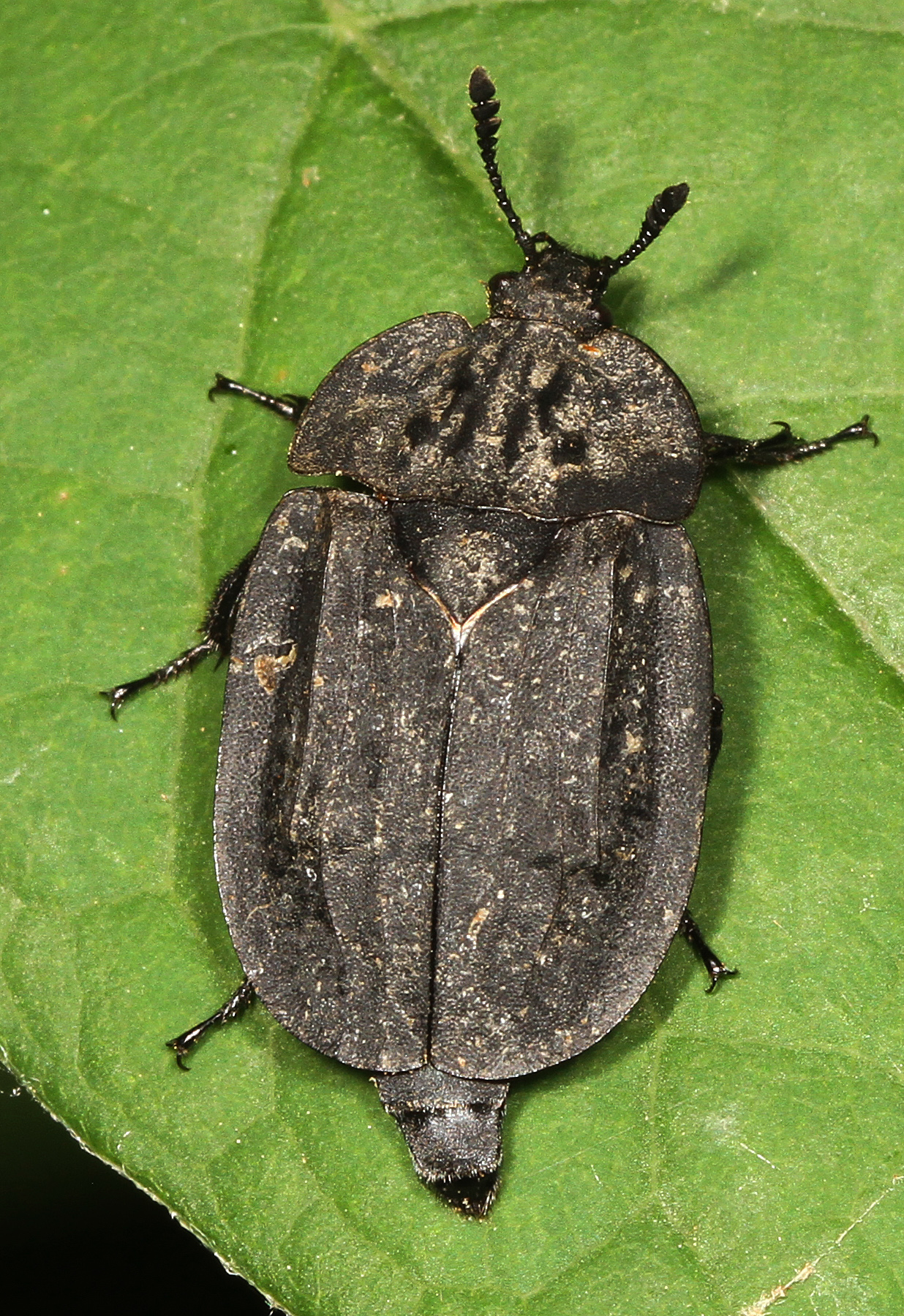
Ridged carrion beetle, Oiceoptoma inaequale

It has been witnessed breeding in and on a western rat snake carcass.
