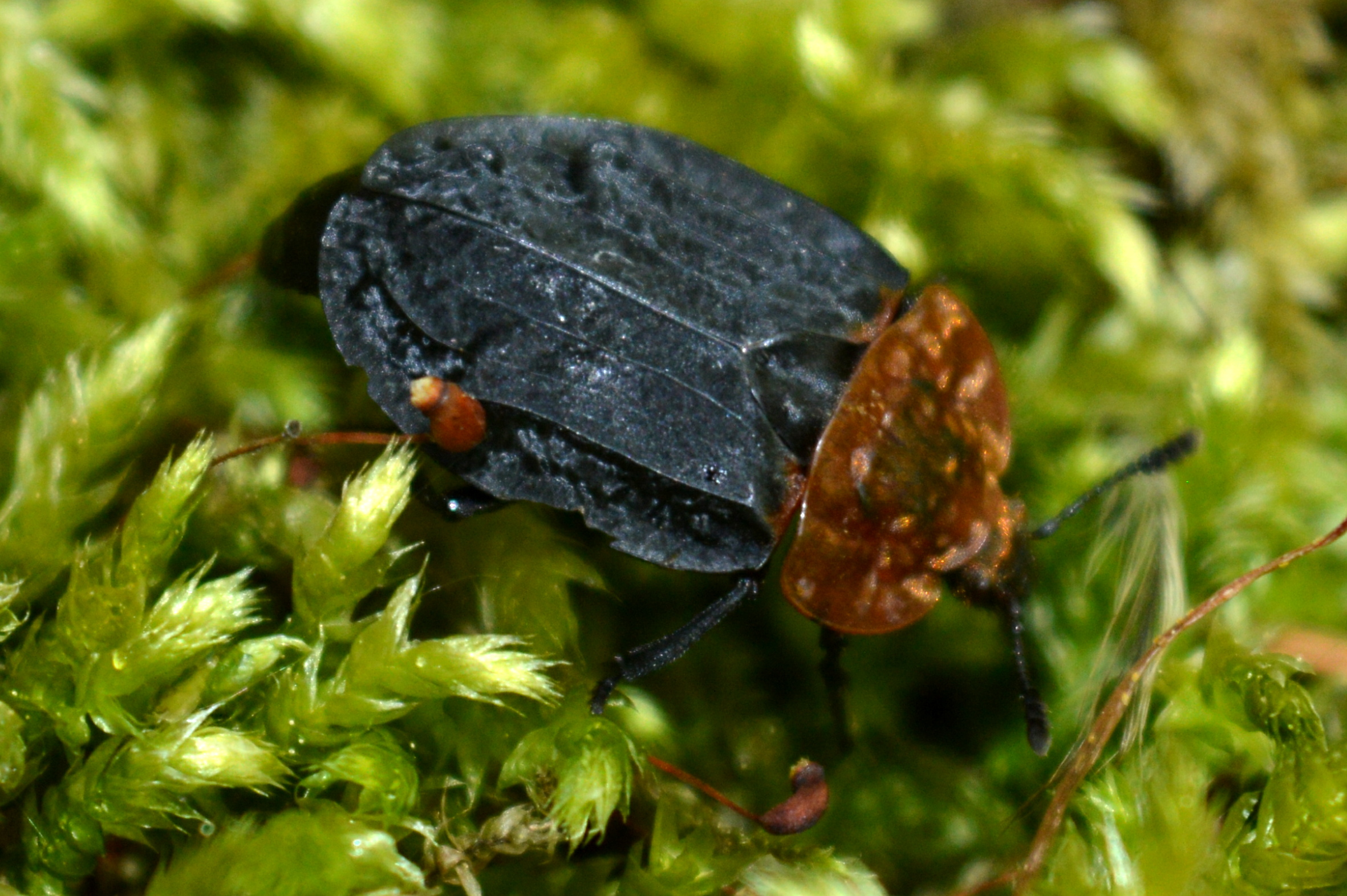
- Oiceoptoma thoracicum, red-breasted carrion beetle

Scientific classification
- Kingdom: Animalia
- Phylum: Arthropoda
- Clade: Pancrustacea
- Class: Insecta
- Order: Coleoptera
- Suborder: Polyphaga
- Infraorder: Staphyliniformia
- Family: Staphylinidae
- Genus: Oiceoptoma
- Species: O. thoracicum

Binomial name
- Oiceoptoma thoracicum (Linnaeus, 1758)

= Oiceoptoma thoracicum =

Species of carrion beetle

Oiceoptoma thoracicum, the red-breasted carrion beetle, is a species of carrion beetle in the family Silphidae. It is found in the Palearctic. As a carrion beetle, this species is a generalist that can have importance in forensic entomology. Larval survival to adulthood occurs most often if the beetles are fed pork compared to beef or chicken.
