= Oiceoptoma rugulosum =

Scientific classification
- Kingdom: Animalia
- Phylum: Arthropoda
- Clade: Pancrustacea
- Class: Insecta
- Order: Coleoptera
- Suborder: Polyphaga
- Infraorder: Staphyliniformia
- Family: Staphylinidae
- Genus: Oiceoptoma
- Species: O. rugulosum

Binomial name
- Oiceoptoma rugulosum (Portevin, 1903)

Species of beetle

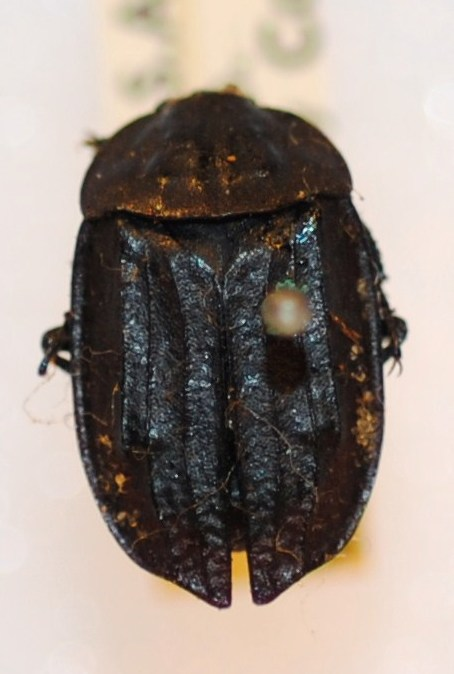
Oiceoptoma inaequale var. rugulosum

Oiceoptoma rugulosum is a species of carrion beetle in the family Silphidae. It is found in North America.
