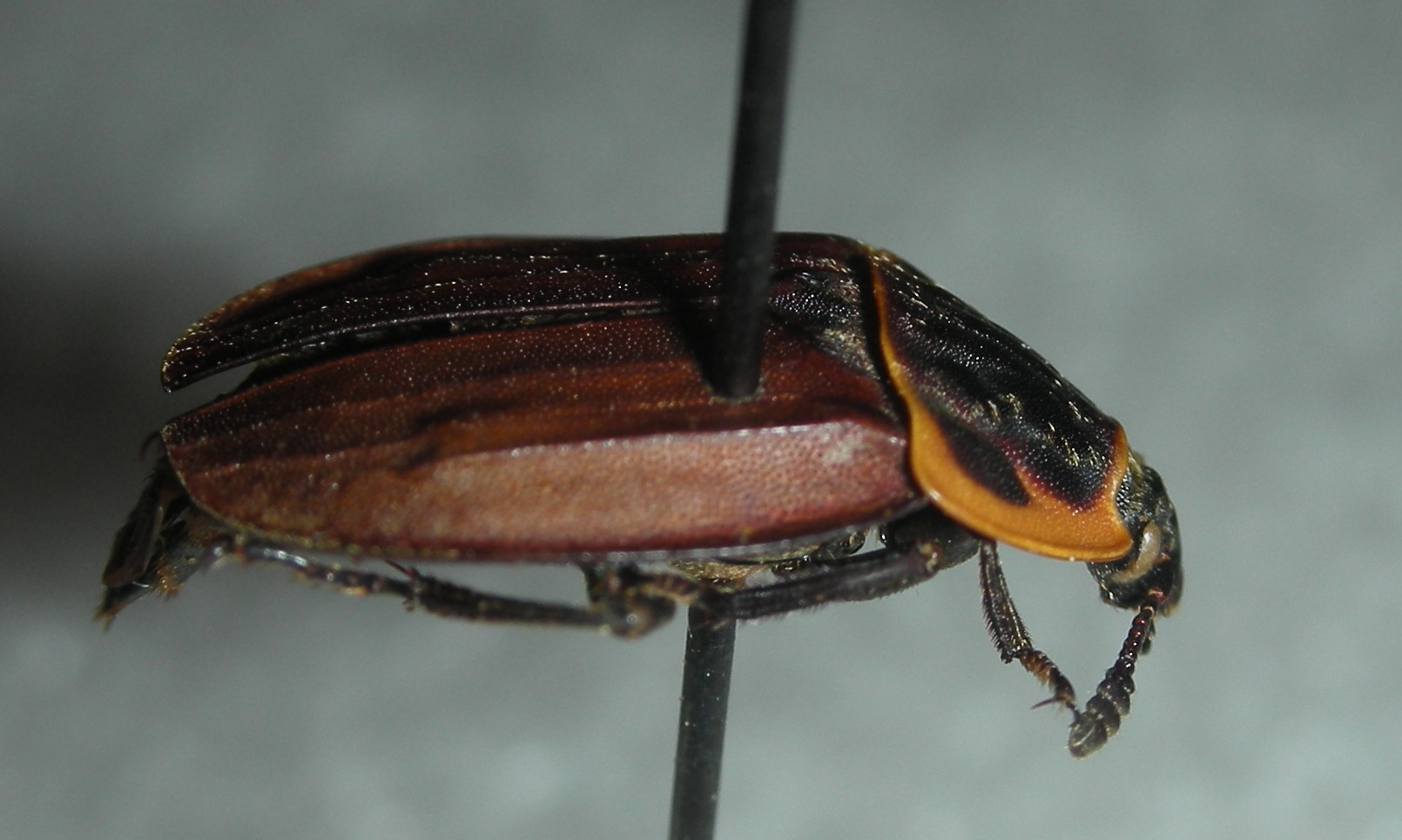

Scientific classification
- Kingdom: Animalia
- Phylum: Arthropoda
- Clade: Pancrustacea
- Class: Insecta
- Order: Coleoptera
- Suborder: Polyphaga
- Infraorder: Staphyliniformia
- Family: Staphylinidae
- Genus: Oiceoptoma
- Species: O. noveboracense

Binomial name
- Oiceoptoma noveboracense (Forster, 1771)

Synonyms
- Silpha marginalis Fabricius, 1777; Silpha noveboracensis J.R. Forster, 1771

= Oiceoptoma noveboracense =

Species of beetle

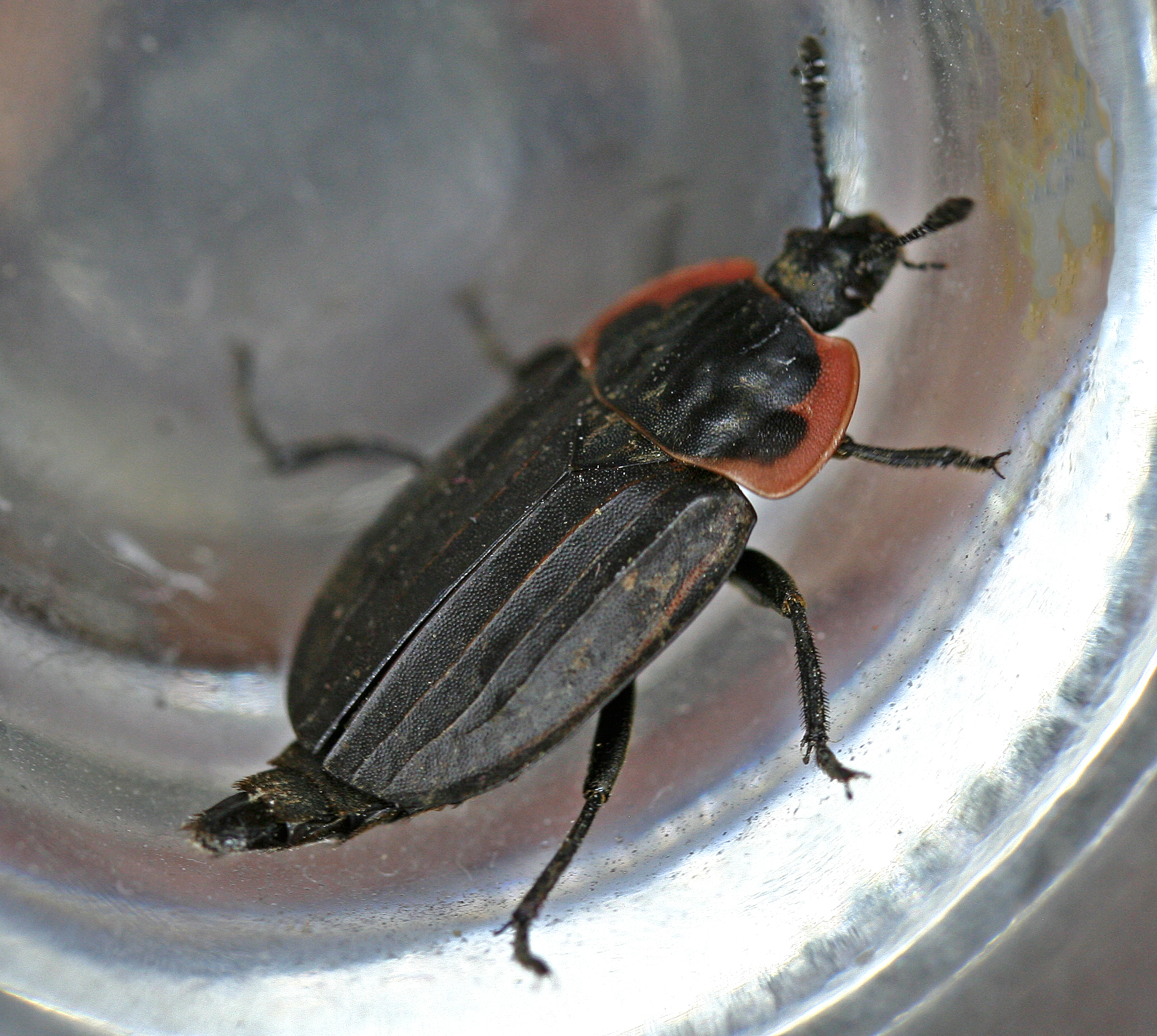
Margined Carrion Beetle (Oiceoptoma noveboracense)

Oiceoptoma noveboracense is a member of the family Silphinae, or carrion beetles, which feed on decaying organic matter such as dead animals. Its common name is the margined carrion beetle, from the orange-red margins on the pronotum, which are helpful when identifying this species. The larva is typically light brown to red and also has vertical ridges on its thorax like the adult. This diurnal beetle can be found mainly in the spring into the fall, and it has a strong preference towards a deciduous forest habitat. The primary forensic importance of this beetle is its ability to use the succession of insect fauna to provide confirmation of postmortem intervals.

== Taxonomy ==
Oiceoptoma noveboracense's Latin specific name means "pertaining to New York" (Latin Novum Eboracum + -ensis), referring to the original source of the type specimen. Although less common, some literature will refer to the species as Oiceoptoma noveboracensis. The genus Oiceoptoma was described by the English naturalist, William Elford Leach, in 1815.

== Description ==
Oiceoptoma noveboracense larvae range from light brown to dark reddish in color. The larvae are typically flat and trilobite-like in appearance. They are capable of moving locations during their development.

The adults average from 13 to 15 millimetres (0.5 to 0.6 in) long. The middle of the pronotum (dorsal side, first segment of the thorax) on this beetle is dark-brown to black in color. The outer margins are outlined in a bright orange-red (salmon colored). The elytra are hardened forewings used to protect the fragile hind wings underneath. The elytra are attached to the suture that runs down the middle of the beetle's back and range from reddish brown to black. They have a distinctive tooth at the shoulder and the vertical ridges are very apparent. This elytra apex is rounded on males, whereas it is more tapered on the female body. O. noveboracense have temple regions behind their eyes that have a long line of erect setae that are of a yellowish tint and the inner tomora is a ridge-free region. The metatibiae are enlarged on the males ranging from moderate to large in size.

== Life cycle ==
Oiceoptoma noveboracense is a diurnal species, meaning that it is primarily active during the daytime. This beetle produces one generation per year. Reproduction begins in the spring and depending on temperature it takes approximately forty-five days from the instance of mating to the emergence of the adult from the pupa. The eggs are laid in the carrion so that once they become larva they will begin to feed on their substrate. As is common with most Silphidae, the adults will typically feed on carrion as well as the larva of flies that are also feeding on the carrion.

During the springtime when mating is observable, adults are commonly found paired with the males mounted on the females. This position will be maintained for periods of time even though copulation may not be occurring at that instant. Typically, males will firmly take hold of the female’s antennae with their mandibles in order to position themselves for sexual activity. Once copulation is achieved the male will release the female’s antenna and begin to slide backward onto the female’s elytra. He will then begin to use his antennae to stroke the pronotum of the female. Again the male searches for and grabs the female’s antennae and this series of events is repeated. This activity will occur frequently until the female oviposits. Males have not been seen to be sexually active when the eggs and/or instar larvae are present at the carcass. This behavior suggests that the males might use this time to insure paternity of the offspring of the particular female with which he mated.

== Distribution and habitat ==
Oiceoptoma noveboracense is most commonly found in deciduous forests or in grasslands and fields. It will less frequently inhabit marshes. When the species is found in a marsh, the area is typically prone to seasonal inundation. This causes the marsh to superficially resemble a dried field habitat.

O. noveboracense is found from the Atlantic coast of the Northeastern United States, extending along the northern edge of the prairies west to the Rocky Mountains. It may be present as far south as Texas.

== Importance ==
=== Forensic ===
Due to its widespread distribution, Oiceoptoma noveboracense is frequently found on carrion and associated crime scene investigations. They are currently used to substantiate and support insect colonization timelines and help estimate Post-mortem interval (PMI). Arriving variably after initial insect colonizers (flies), the adults will prey on fly maggots and rarely feed on the carrion. They can also be found in the later stages of decomposition depending on variables like temperature, climate, and location of the carrion. Ultimately, if found, these beetles corroborate the PMI data of the more useful insect colonizers with succession-pattern-based information.

=== Medical ===
The medical importance of Oiceoptoma noveboracense has yet to be substantially determined. However, a study has found its hindgut, midgut, and associated hemolymph can potentially harbor known opportunistic bacterial pathogens. Of these opportunistic pathogens, the majority of the identified bacteria were either coliform or staphylococci.

== Current and future research ==
Previous research investigated the seasonal activity and habitat preferences of this necrophagous beetle. Overall it has been observed that this Silphid species prefers the forest environment and warmer months.

The ability of O. noveboracense to transmit microorganisms has also been researched. In one study it was confirmed that medically true bacteria were found in the midgut, hindgut, and associated hemolymph. Even though these bacteria were isolated, it is only hypothesized that they may serve as a reservoir host. Further research could determine whether O. noveboracense is able to actually transmit the bacteria present. More succession studies may be able to narrow the time frame at which this beetle is attracted to carrion.
