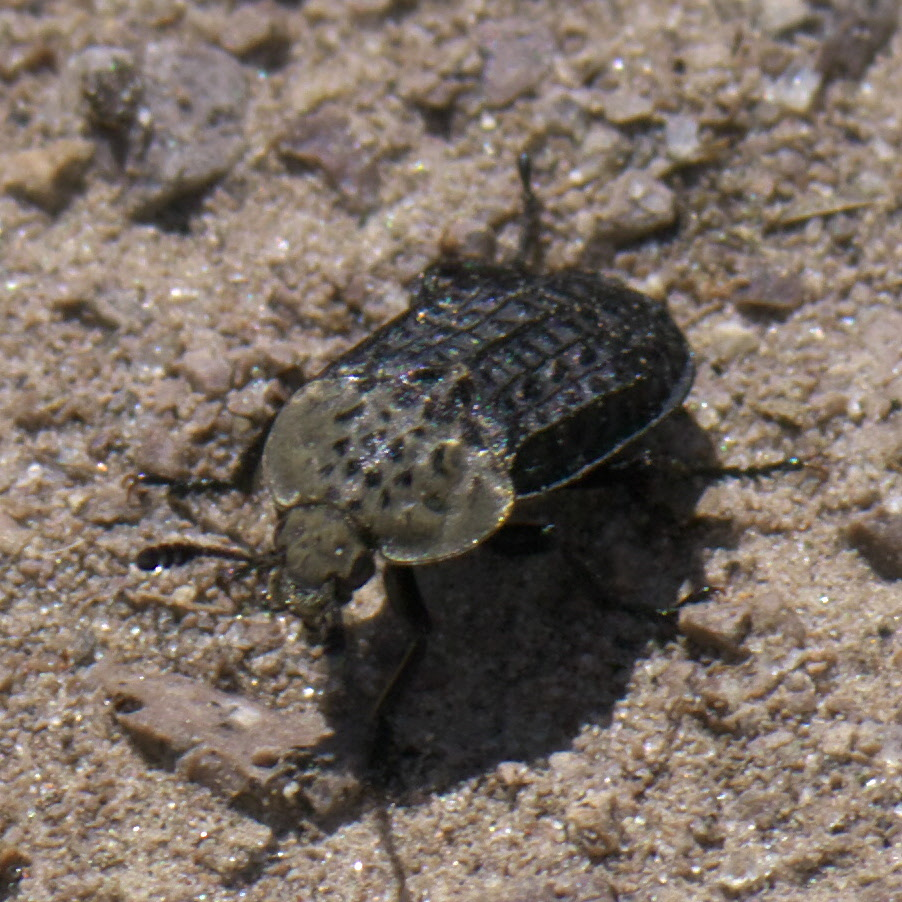

Scientific classification
- Kingdom: Animalia
- Phylum: Arthropoda
- Clade: Pancrustacea
- Class: Insecta
- Order: Coleoptera
- Suborder: Polyphaga
- Infraorder: Staphyliniformia
- Family: Staphylinidae
- Genus: Thanatophilus
- Species: T. lapponicus

Binomial name
- Thanatophilus lapponicus (Herbst, 1793)

= Thanatophilus lapponicus =

Species of beetle

Thanatophilus lapponicus, the northern carrion beetle, is a species of carrion beetle in the family Silphidae. It is found in Europe and Northern Asia (excluding China), Central America, and North America.
