= C. spicata =

C. spicata may refer to:

- Calycadenia spicata Greene – the spiked western rosinweed
- Carex spicata Huds. – a species of sedge
- Corylopsis spicata Siebold & Zucc. – the winter hazel, a species of witch hazel
- Cussonia spicata Thunb. – the spiked cabbage tree, lowveld cabbage tree or common cabbage tree

== See also ==
- The dictionary definition of Spicata at Wiktionary
