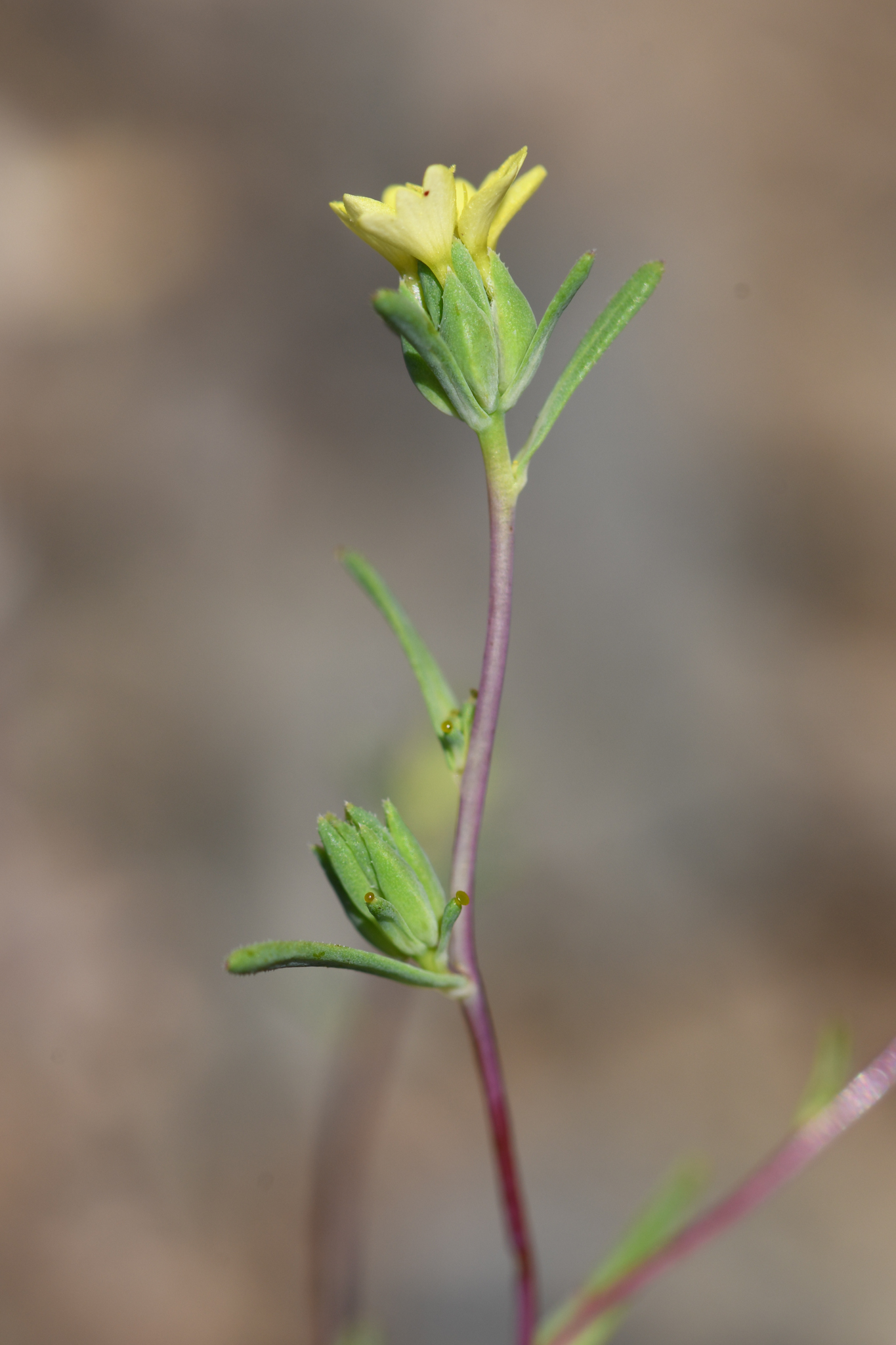

Conservation status
- Imperiled (NatureServe)

Scientific classification
- Kingdom: Plantae
- Clade: Embryophytes
- Clade: Tracheophytes
- Clade: Spermatophytes
- Clade: Angiosperms
- Clade: Eudicots
- Clade: Asterids
- Order: Asterales
- Family: Asteraceae
- Genus: Calycadenia
- Species: C. micrantha

Binomial name
- Calycadenia micrantha R.L.Carr & G.D.Carr

Synonyms
- Calycadenia truncata subsp. microcephala H.M.Hall ex D.D.Keck

= Calycadenia micrantha =

Species of flowering plant

Calycadenia micrantha is an uncommon species of flowering plant in the family Asteraceae known by the common name small-flowered calycadenia. It is endemic to California, where it is known from about 13 occurrences that are widely spread over several counties, including Napa, Siskiyou, Shasta, Mendocino, Trinity, and Monterey Counties, with several populations known in Lake County. It was described to science as a species in 2004. Some specimens of the plant had previously been included within the description of its relative, Calycadenia truncata. The fact that it has been found in relatively far-flung locations suggests it could easily be present in other areas between them and, as a newly classified species, has simply not been reported yet.

This annual plant produces a slender purplish stem 10 to 50 centimeters tall. The hairy leaves are 2 to 5 centimeters long. The inflorescence is a single flower head or small cluster of heads, each with 1 to 6 three-lobed yellow ray florets. Unlike other Calycadenia species, this plant is self-compatible, or able to fertilize itself.
