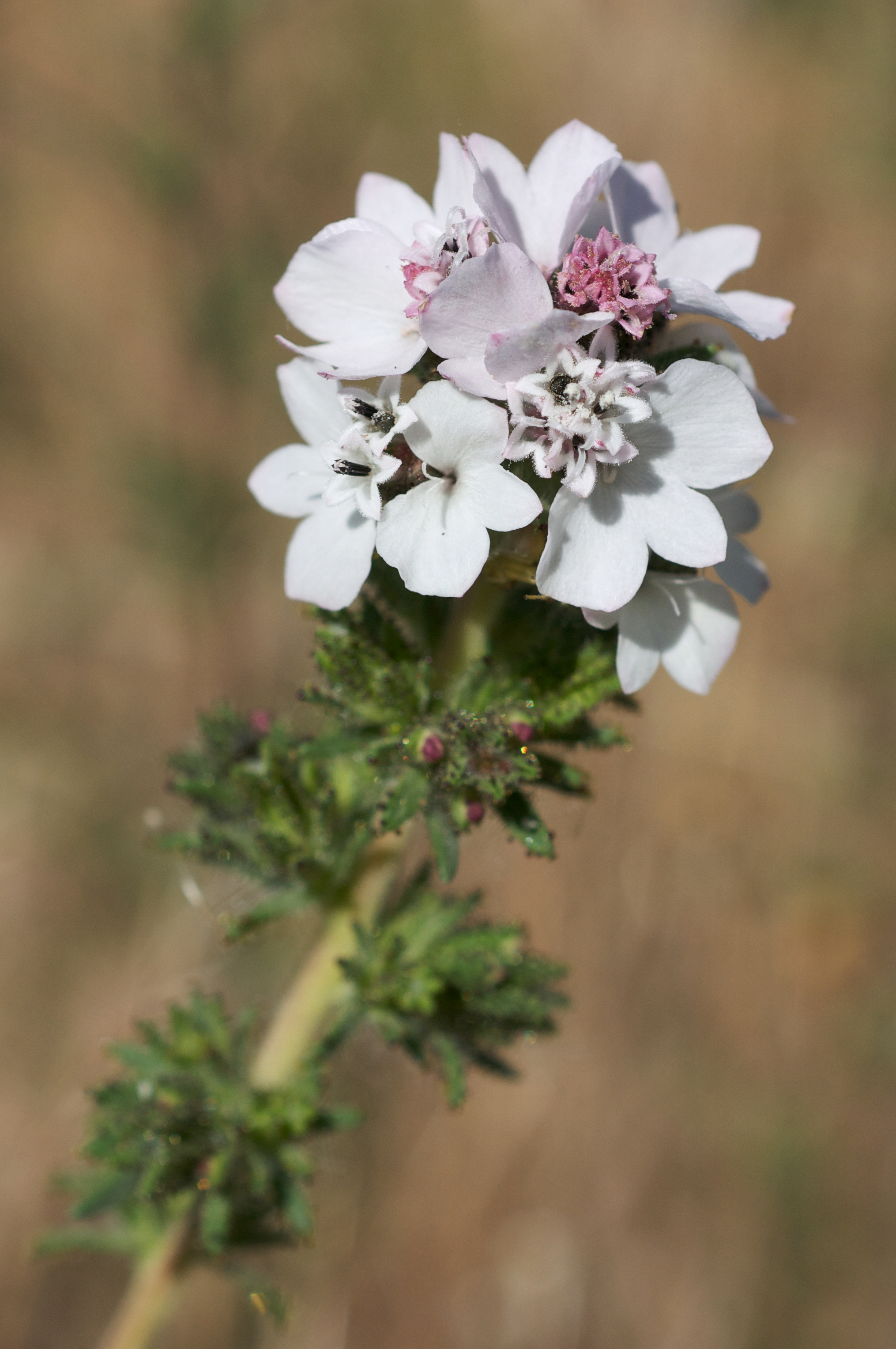
- Calycadenia multiglandulosa

Scientific classification
- Kingdom: Plantae
- Clade: Tracheophytes
- Clade: Angiosperms
- Clade: Eudicots
- Clade: Asterids
- Order: Asterales
- Family: Asteraceae
- Subfamily: Asteroideae
- Tribe: Madieae
- Subtribe: Madiinae
- Genus: Calycadenia; DC.

= Calycadenia =

Genus of flowering plants

Calycadenia is a genus of flowering plants in the family Asteraceae, known commonly as the western rosinweeds. They are native to California, especially around the Central Valley. The ranges of two species (C. fremontii + C. truncata) do extend north into Oregon.

== Description ==
These are annual herbs variable in size from just a few centimeters tall to well over one meter. They are aromatic. The leaves are alternately arranged except in C. oppositifolia, in which they are opposite. The leaves are narrow and linear in shape, resembling grass leaves. They sometimes have slightly toothed edges. Flower heads are solitary or borne in open arrays or clusters in the leaf axils. The peduncles that hold the flower heads have bracts with one or more tack-shaped glands. The head usually has one or more phyllaries stuck to the ray florets; these often have similar tack-shaped glands. There are one to six ray florets on the head, each with 3 lobes at the tip. They are white, cream, pink, or yellow, and some have a dark red spot near the base. There are up to 25 disc florets in shades of white, cream, pink, or yellow, with anthers that are usually purple or black, sometimes yellow or brown. The fruit is an angular cypsela. Fruits from the disc flowers usually have pappi made up of several scales.

The gland-dotted bracts on the peduncles are a distinguishing character of the genus. The name Calycadenia comes from the Greek calyx ("cup") and aden ("gland"), and references the tack-shaped glands on these bracts and the phyllaries.

== Biology ==
Most of the species are self-incompatible. The biology of the genus is variable; several species have races that differ in chromosome count but not much in morphology, while several others have races that are different in morphology but all have the same chromosome count.

== Species ==
Species

- Calycadenia fremontii – Frémont's western rosinweed
- Calycadenia hooveri – Hoover's western rosinweed
- Calycadenia micrantha – small-flowered calycadenia
- Calycadenia mollis – soft western rosinweed
- Calycadenia multiglandulosa – sticky western rosinweed
- Calycadenia oppositifolia – Butte County western rosinweed
- Calycadenia pauciflora – smallflower western rosinweed
- Calycadenia spicata – spiked western rosinweed
- Calycadenia truncata – Oregon western rosinweed
- Calycadenia villosa – dwarf western rosinweed

formerly included

- Calycadenia tenella Torr. & A. Gray, see Osmadenia tenella Nutt.
