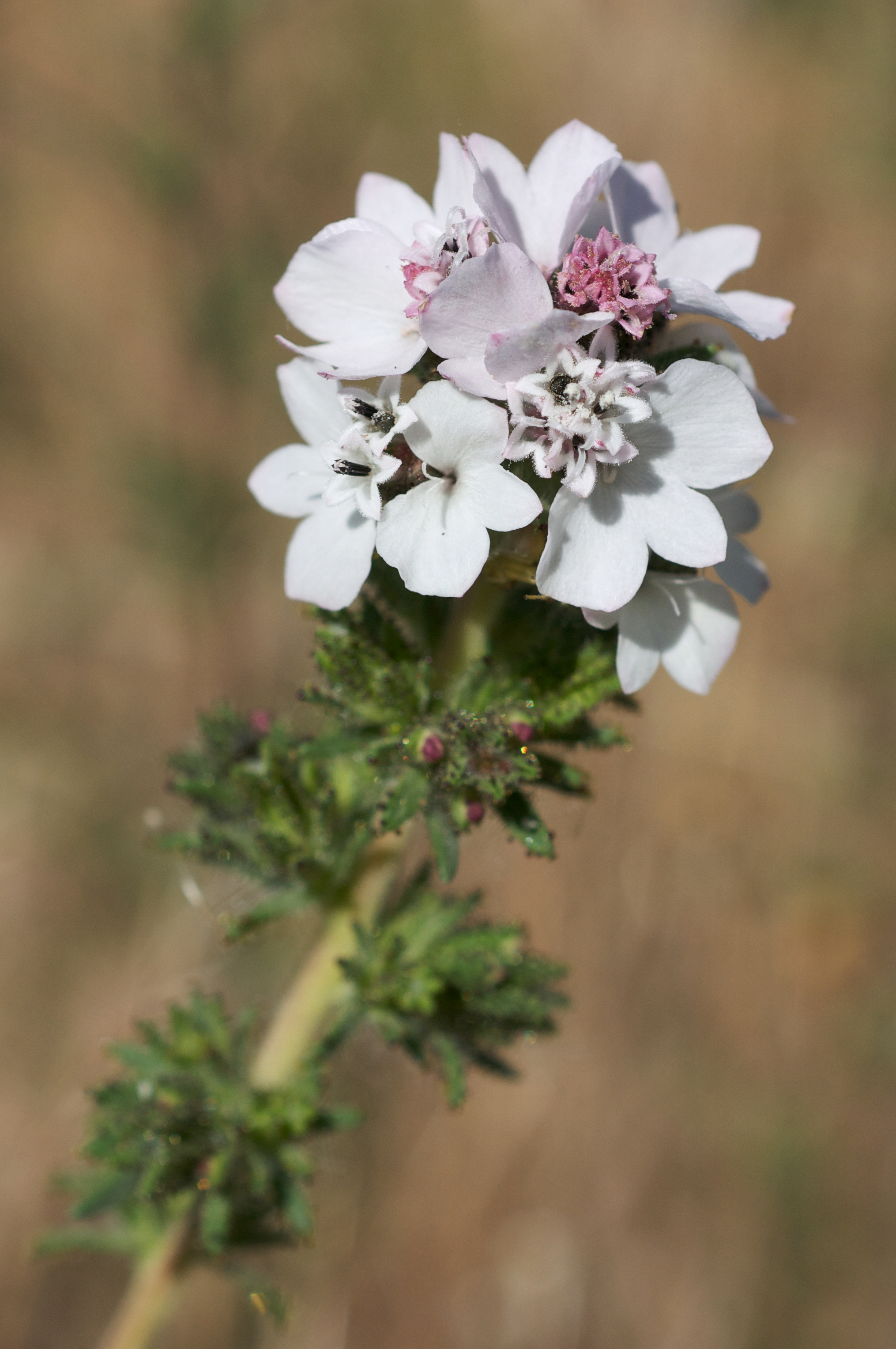

Conservation status
- Vulnerable (NatureServe)

Scientific classification
- Kingdom: Plantae
- Clade: Tracheophytes
- Clade: Angiosperms
- Clade: Eudicots
- Clade: Asterids
- Order: Asterales
- Family: Asteraceae
- Genus: Calycadenia
- Species: C. multiglandulosa

Binomial name
- Calycadenia multiglandulosa DC.

Synonyms
- Calycadenia bicolor Greene; Calycadenia campestris Greene; Calycadenia cephalotes DC.; Calycadenia hispida (Greene) Greene; Hemizonia cephalotes (DC.) Greene; Hemizonia hispida Greene

= Calycadenia multiglandulosa =

Species of flowering plant

Calycadenia multiglandulosa is a species of flowering plant in the family Asteraceae, known by the common names sticky calycadenia and sticky western rosinweed. It is endemic to California, where it is a common in the Coast Ranges and in the Sierra Nevada Foothills from Shasta County to Kern County.

== Description ==
This is an annual herb producing an erect, hairy, glandular stem up to 70 centimeters (28 inches) tall. The leaves are linear in shape and up to 8 centimeters long. The inflorescence is a series of dense clusters of flower heads surrounded by long, narrow bracts covered in obvious bulbous glands. The sticky, glandular flower head has a center of several disc florets surrounded by a few white, yellow, or red ray florets. Each ray floret has three lobes at the tip, the middle lobe being shortest. The fruit is an achene; those developing from the disc florets have a pappus of scales.
