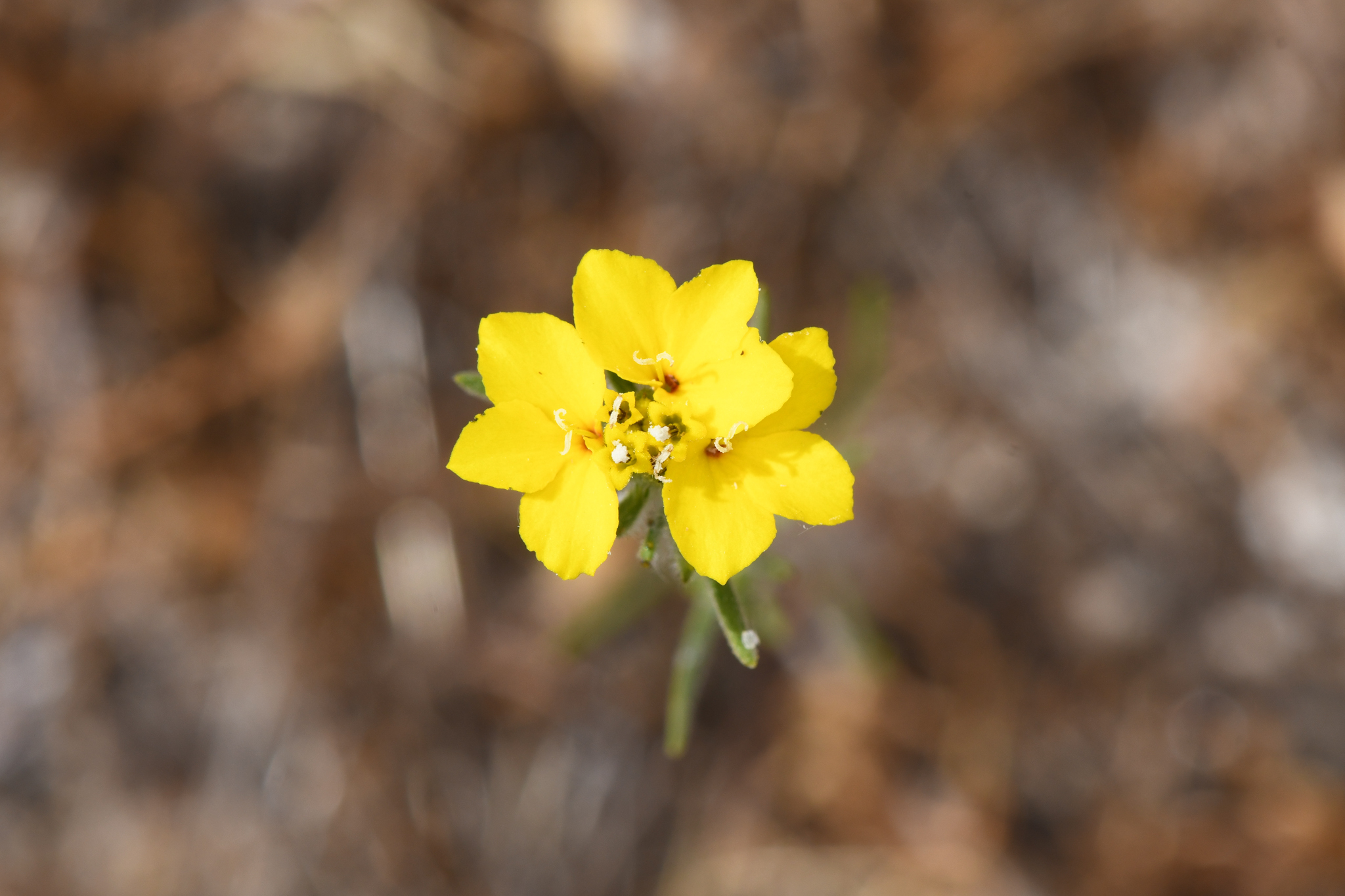

Conservation status
- Vulnerable (NatureServe)

Scientific classification
- Kingdom: Plantae
- Clade: Tracheophytes
- Clade: Angiosperms
- Clade: Eudicots
- Clade: Asterids
- Order: Asterales
- Family: Asteraceae
- Genus: Calycadenia
- Species: C. mollis

Binomial name
- Calycadenia mollis A.Gray

Synonyms
- Hemizonia mollis (A.Gray) A.Gray

= Calycadenia mollis =

Species of flowering plant

Calycadenia mollis is a species of flowering plant in the family Asteraceae known by the common name soft western rosinweed. It is native to a section of central California, from Tuolumne County to northern Tulare County. There are also isolated populations further north in Nevada County. The plant grows in a number of habitat types in the Central Valley and adjacent Sierra Nevada foothills.

Calycadenia mollis is an annual herb producing an upright, hairy stem up to 90 centimeters tall. The leaves are linear in shape and up to 8 centimeters long, the longest ones generally toward the middle of the stem. The inflorescence bears several long clusters of small, very glandular flower heads, each of which has one or more white, yellow, or red triple-lobed ray florets around a center of disc florets. The fruit is an achene; those arising from the disc florets have a pappus of about eight scales.
