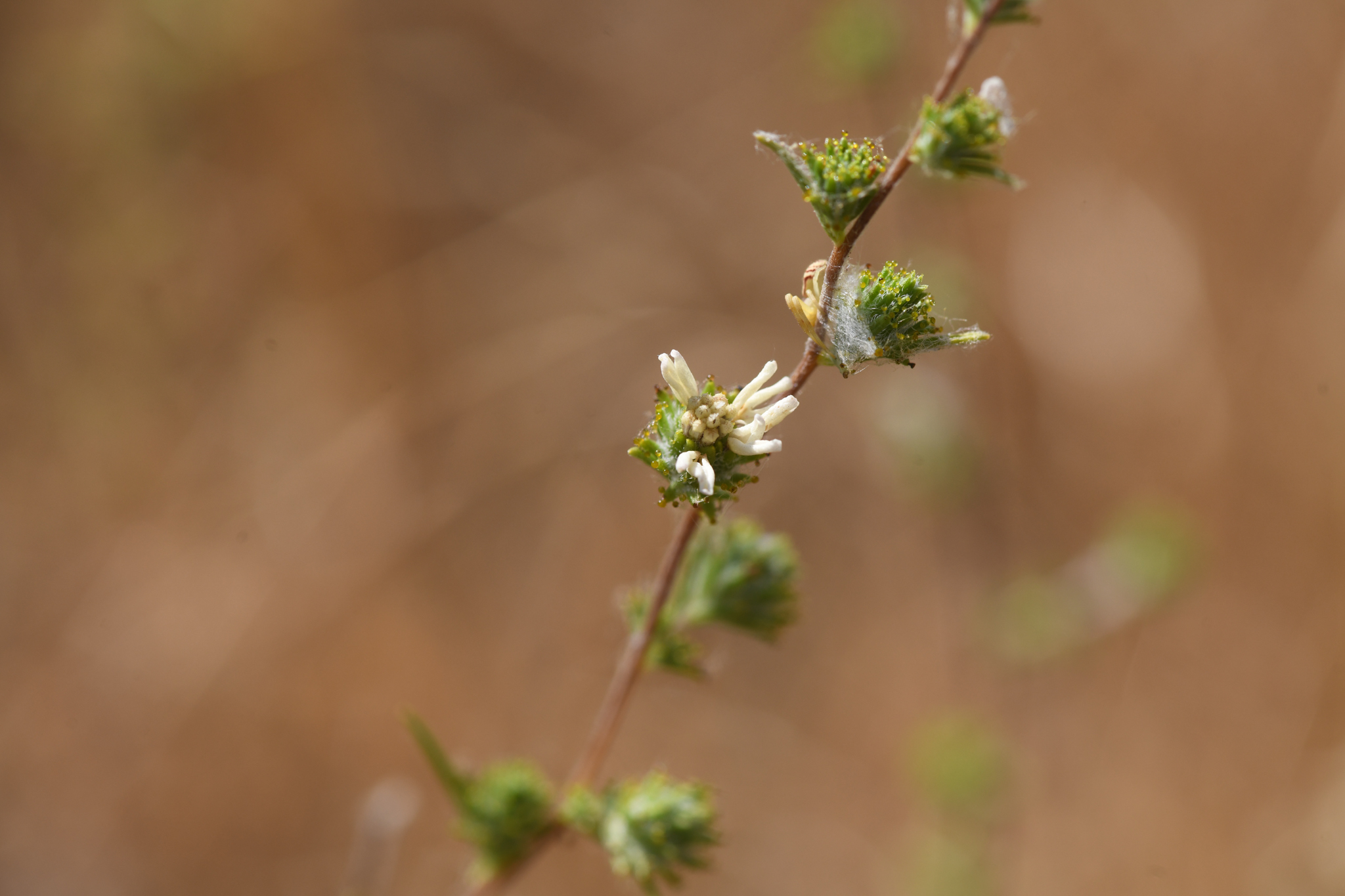

Scientific classification
- Kingdom: Plantae
- Clade: Embryophytes
- Clade: Tracheophytes
- Clade: Angiosperms
- Clade: Eudicots
- Clade: Asterids
- Order: Asterales
- Family: Asteraceae
- Genus: Calycadenia
- Species: C. fremontii

Binomial name
- Calycadenia fremontii A.Gray

Synonyms
- Calycadenia ciliosa Greene; Hemizonia fremontii (A.Gray) A.Gray; Hemizonia multiglandulosa var. sparsa A.Gray

= Calycadenia fremontii =

Species of flowering plant

Calycadenia fremontii is a species of flowering plant in the daisy family known by the common name Frémont's western rosinweed (after John C. Frémont). It is native to southwestern Oregon (Josephine + Jackson Counties) and northern California (mostly north of Napa and Placer Counties but with a few isolated populations in Santa Clara and Tuolumne Counties). It is a common member of the flora in several types of habitat in the mountains, foothills, and valleys. This annual plant is variable in appearance.

Calycadenia fremontii produces a rigid, erect, hairy stem reaching a top height anywhere between 10 centimeters (2 inches) and one meter (40 inches). The leaves are linear in shape and arranged alternately along the stem, especially on the lower part. The largest is up to 8 centimeters long. The inflorescence bears one or more glandular flower heads, each with 2 to 6 three-lobed ray florets in shades of white to red to yellow, and up to 20 disc florets at the center. The fruit is an achene; achenes from the disc florets may have a pappus of scales.
