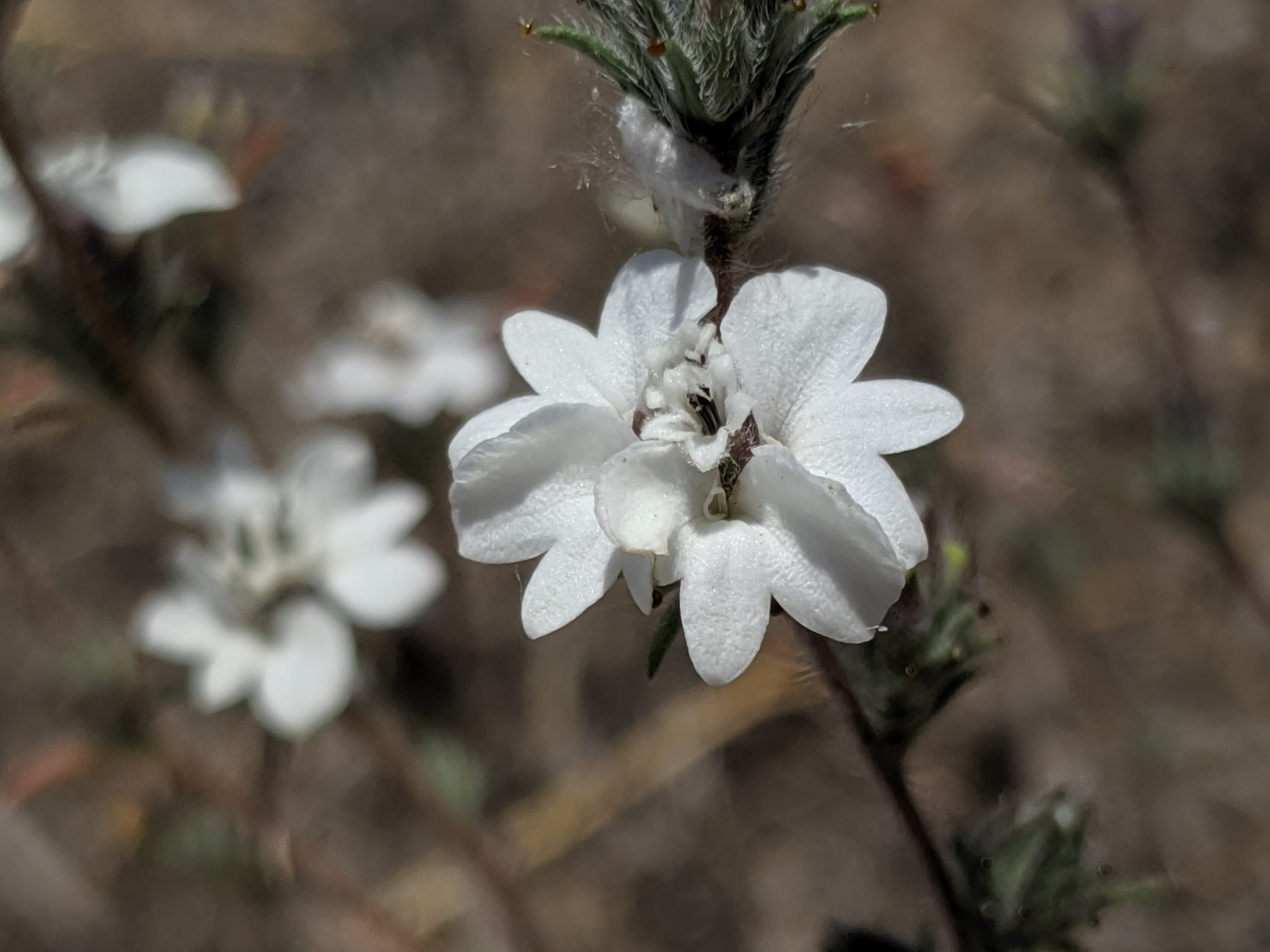

Conservation status
- Vulnerable (NatureServe)

Scientific classification
- Kingdom: Plantae
- Clade: Tracheophytes
- Clade: Angiosperms
- Clade: Eudicots
- Clade: Asterids
- Order: Asterales
- Family: Asteraceae
- Genus: Calycadenia
- Species: C. villosa

Binomial name
- Calycadenia villosa DC.

Synonyms
- Hemizonia douglasii A.Gray

= Calycadenia villosa =

Species of flowering plant

Calycadenia villosa is an uncommon species of flowering plant in the family Asteraceae known by the common name dwarf western rosinweed. It is endemic to central California, where it is known from a limited distribution in the Central Coast Ranges in Monterey County and San Luis Obispo County, with a few populations in Santa Barbara and western Fresno Counties. There are perhaps 16 occurrences.

Calycadenia villosa is an annual herb producing a very hairy erect stem approaching 40 centimeters (16 inches) in height. The leaves are linear (long and narrow) and up to 5 centimeters (2 inches) long. The inflorescence is made up of clusters of flower heads surrounded by gland-tipped bracts. Each flower head is a hairless bunch of small disc florets and one to four white to pink ray florets. Each ray floret has three lobes, the middle lobe being narrowest. The fruit is an achene; those developing from disc florets bear a pappus of scales.
