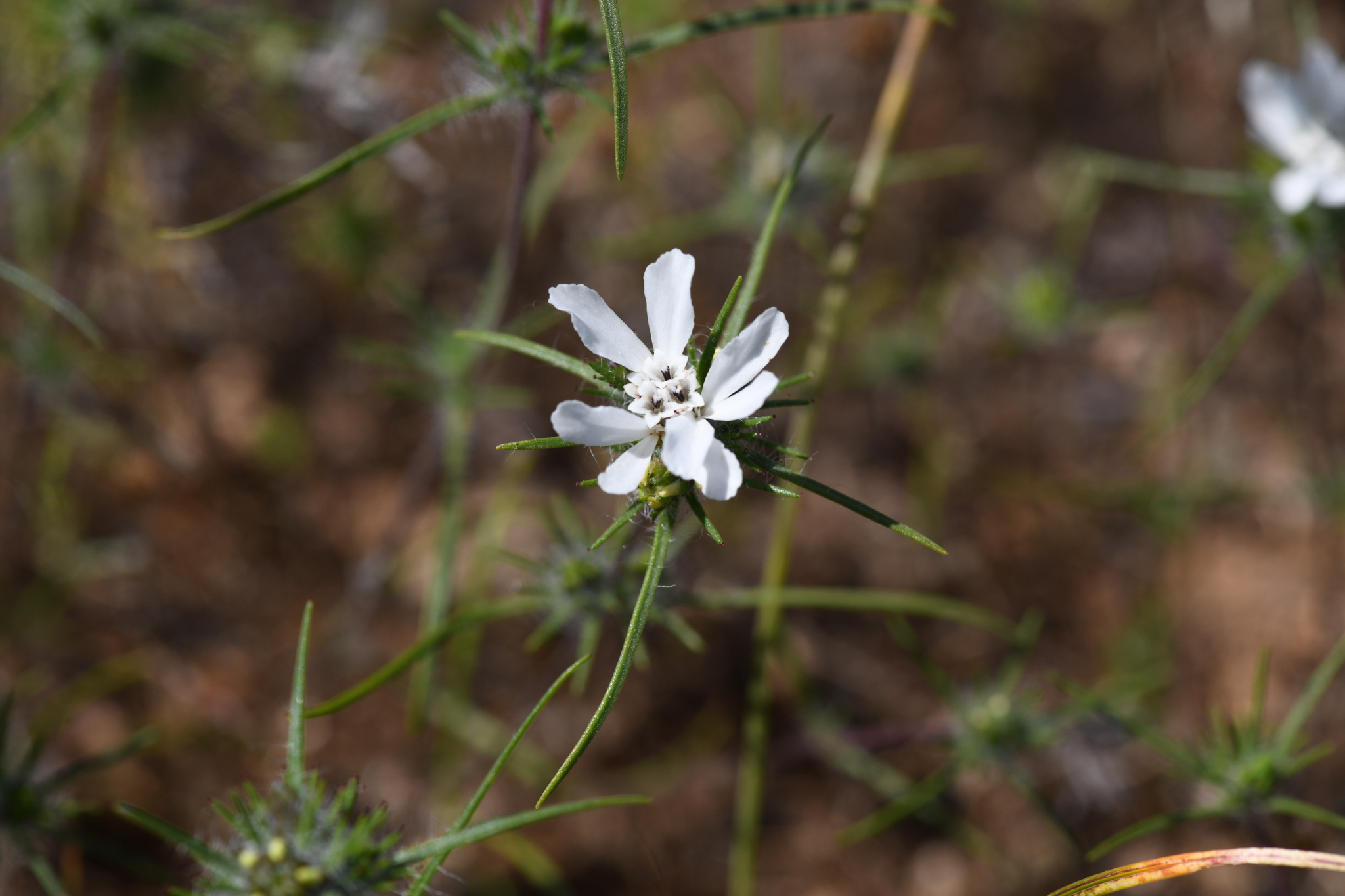

Conservation status
- Vulnerable (NatureServe)

Scientific classification
- Kingdom: Plantae
- Clade: Tracheophytes
- Clade: Angiosperms
- Clade: Eudicots
- Clade: Asterids
- Order: Asterales
- Family: Asteraceae
- Genus: Calycadenia
- Species: C. oppositifolia

Binomial name
- Calycadenia oppositifolia (Greene) Greene

Synonyms
- Hemizonia oppositifolia Greene

= Calycadenia oppositifolia =

Species of flowering plant

Calycadenia oppositifolia is a species of flowering plant in the family Asteraceae known by the common name Butte County western rosinweed. It is native primarily to Butte County, California, although a few populations have been found in other parts of the state. It grows in the foothills of the high mountain ranges.

== Description ==
Calycadenia oppositifolia is an annual herb producing an erect, unbranching, hairy stem approaching 30 centimeters (12 inches) in maximum height. The leaves are linear in shape and up to 5 centimeters (2 inches) long, arranged oppositely about the stem. The inflorescence bears bracts coated in large resin glands and dense clusters of flower heads. The hairy, glandular flower head has a center of several disc florets surrounded by a few white or reddish triple-lobed ray florets. Each ray floret has three lobes at the tip, the middle lobe being shortest. The fruit is an achene; those developing from the disc florets have a pappus of scales.
