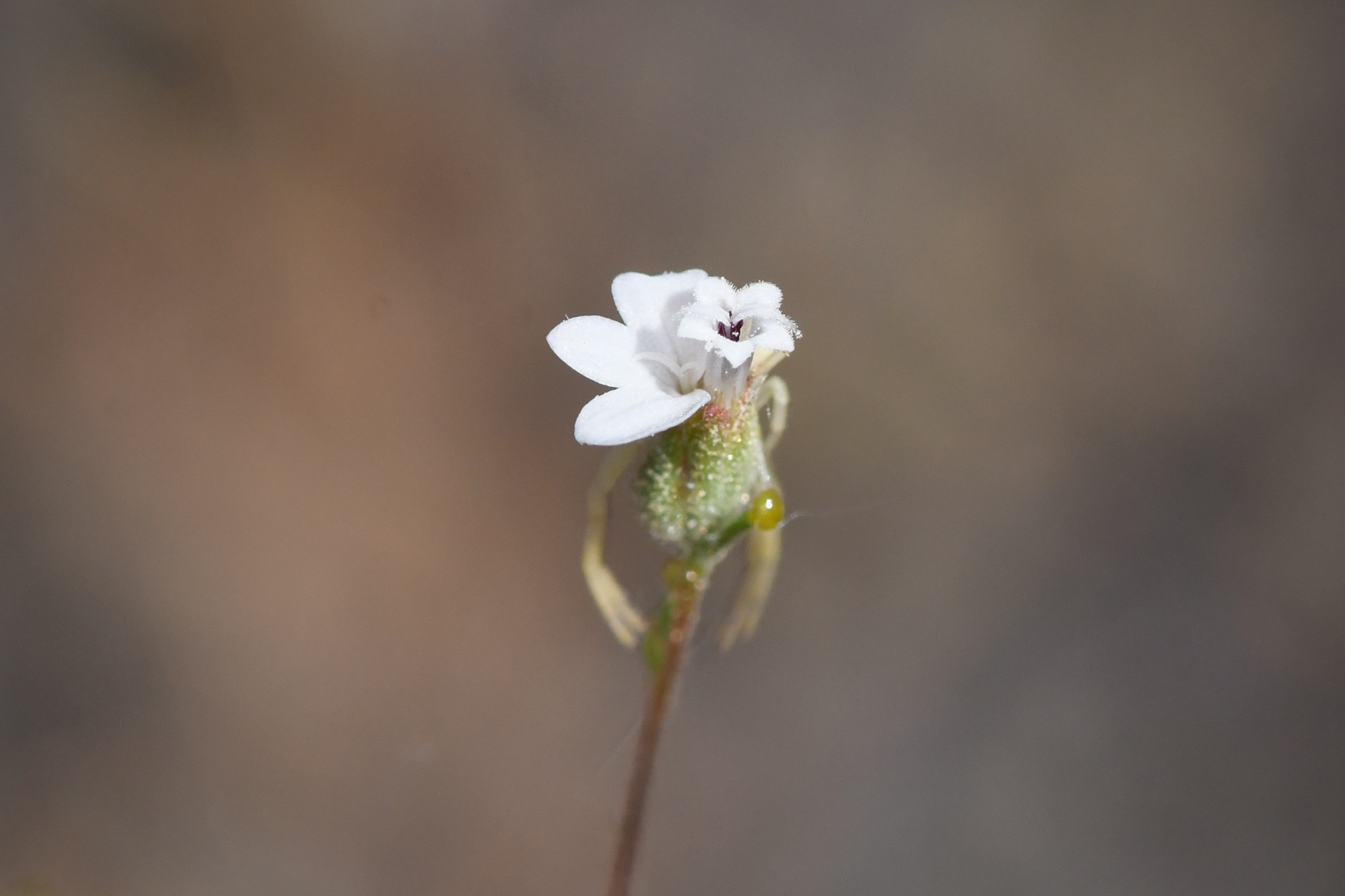

Conservation status
- Imperiled (NatureServe)

Scientific classification
- Kingdom: Plantae
- Clade: Tracheophytes
- Clade: Angiosperms
- Clade: Eudicots
- Clade: Asterids
- Order: Asterales
- Family: Asteraceae
- Genus: Calycadenia
- Species: C. hooveri

Binomial name
- Calycadenia hooveri G.D.Carr

= Calycadenia hooveri =

California species of flowering plant

Calycadenia hooveri is a California species of flowering plant in the family Asteraceae known by the common name Hoover's western rosinweed. It is endemic to a short portion of the western Sierra Nevada foothills, where it grows in rocky areas in the hills along from Amador County to Madera County.

== Description ==
Calycadenia hooveri is an annual herb producing thin, spindly stems 10 to 60 centimeters tall. The leaves are linear in shape and arranged alternately along the stem, especially on the lower part. The largest is up to 8 centimeters long. The inflorescence bears several bracts, each with a bulbous gland on it. It also bears one or more tiny, glandular flower heads, each with 1 or 2 disc florets and sometimes 1 or 2 lobed white ray florets. The fruit is an achene; those arising from the disc florets may have a pappus of scales at the tip.
