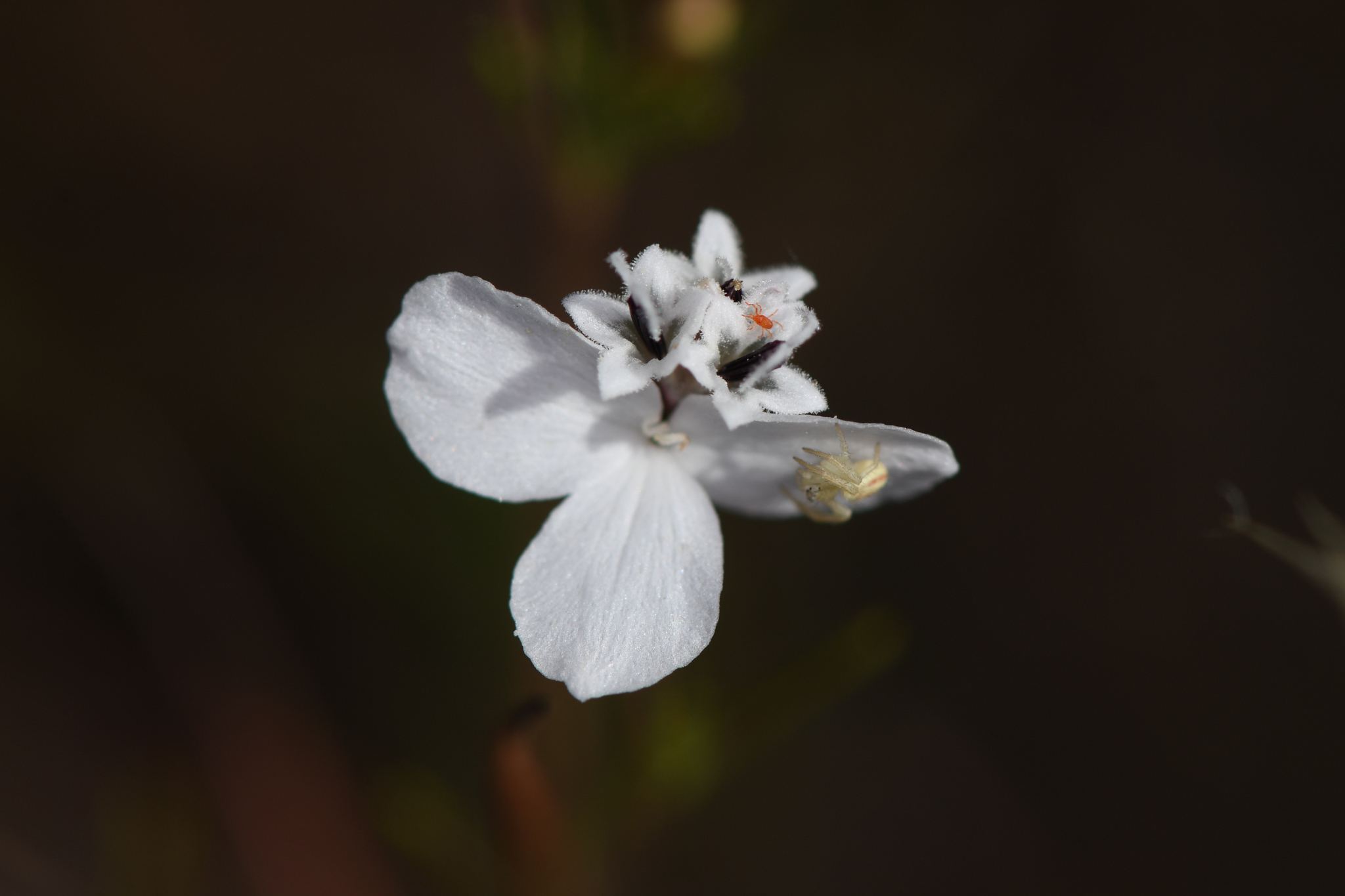

Conservation status
- Vulnerable (NatureServe)

Scientific classification
- Kingdom: Plantae
- Clade: Tracheophytes
- Clade: Angiosperms
- Clade: Eudicots
- Clade: Asterids
- Order: Asterales
- Family: Asteraceae
- Genus: Calycadenia
- Species: C. pauciflora

Binomial name
- Calycadenia pauciflora A.Gray

Synonyms
- Calycadenia elegans Greene; Calycadenia ramulosa Greene; Hemizonia pauciflora (A.Gray) A.Gray

= Calycadenia pauciflora =

Species of flowering plant

Calycadenia pauciflora is a species of flowering plant in the family Asteraceae known by the common name smallflower western rosinweed. It is endemic to northern California, where it grows in the Coast Ranges north of the San Francisco Bay Area from Napa County to Tehama County, often on serpentine soils.

Calycadenia pauciflora is an annual herb producing a slender, crooked, branching stem coated with hairs, growing up to 50 centimeters (20 inches) tall. The leaves are linear in shape and up to 5 centimeters (2 inches) long. The inflorescence bears bracts studded with large resin glands and small clusters of flower heads. The hairy, glandular flower head has a center of a few disc florets and one or two white or red triple-lobed ray florets. Each ray floret has three lobes at the tip, the middle lobe being shortest. The fruit is an achene; those developing from the disc florets have a pappus of scales.

== Taxonomy ==
The specific epithet pauciflora, referring the Latin term for 'few flowered'.
