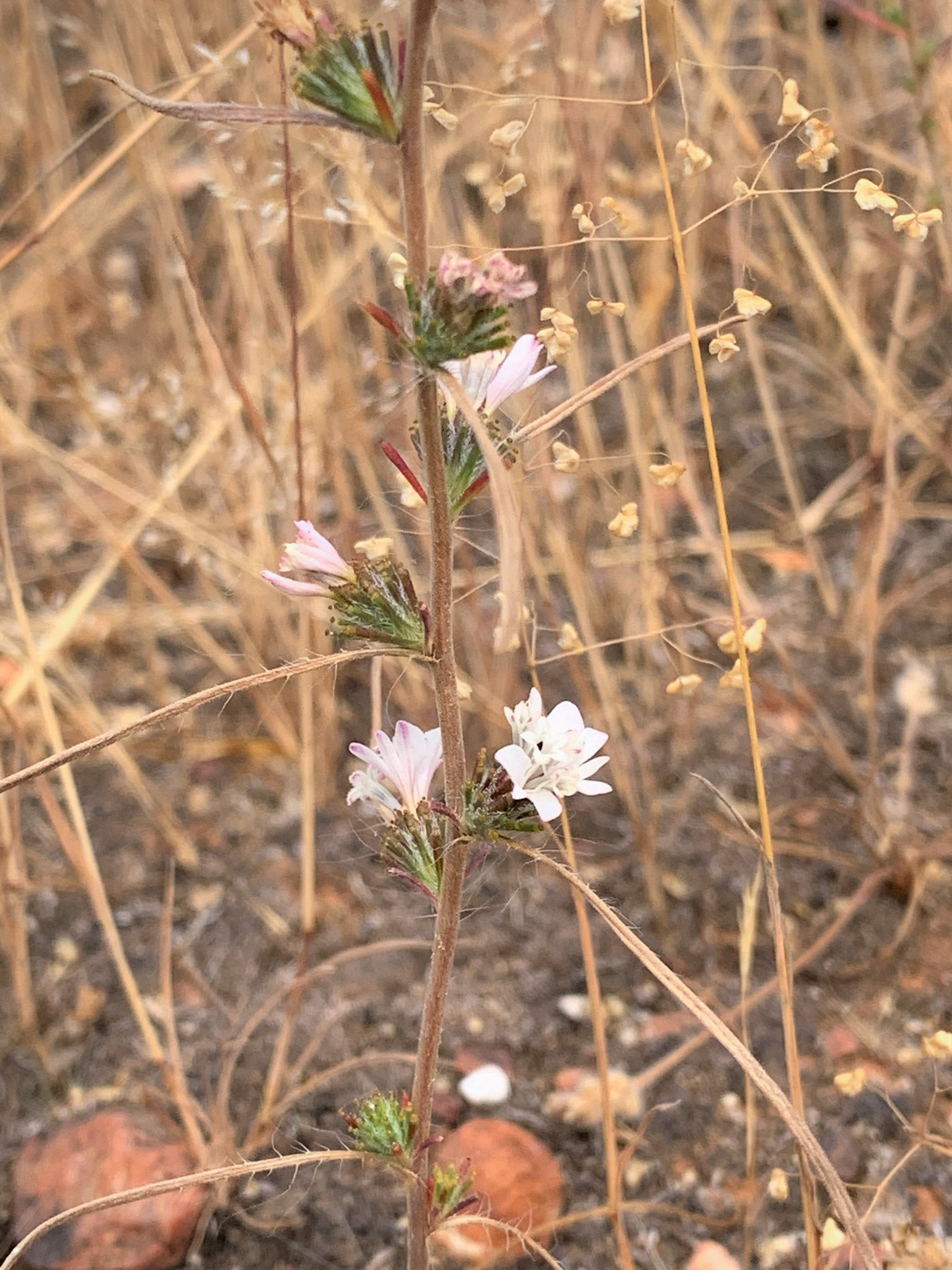

Conservation status
- Vulnerable (NatureServe)

Scientific classification
- Kingdom: Plantae
- Clade: Embryophytes
- Clade: Tracheophytes
- Clade: Angiosperms
- Clade: Eudicots
- Clade: Asterids
- Order: Asterales
- Family: Asteraceae
- Genus: Calycadenia
- Species: C. spicata

Binomial name
- Calycadenia spicata (Greene) Greene

Synonyms
- Hemizonia spicata Greene

= Calycadenia spicata =

Species of flowering plant

Calycadenia spicata is a species of flowering plant in the family Asteraceae known by the common name spiked western rosinweed. It is endemic to central California, where is a common grassland plant in the Central Valley and adjacent Sierra Nevada foothills from Butte County to Kern County.

Calycadenia spicata is an annual herb producing a hairy, glandular stem 20 to 60 centimeters (8-24 inches) tall. The leaves are linear in shape and up to five centimeters (two inches) long, sometimes longest toward the middle of the stem. The inflorescence bears one or more flower heads at separate nodes, surrounded by short bracts tipped with resin glands. The glandular and hairy flower heads have a center of several disc florets as well as whitish, triple-lobed ray florets. The fruit is an achene; those arising from the disc florets have a pappus of scales.
