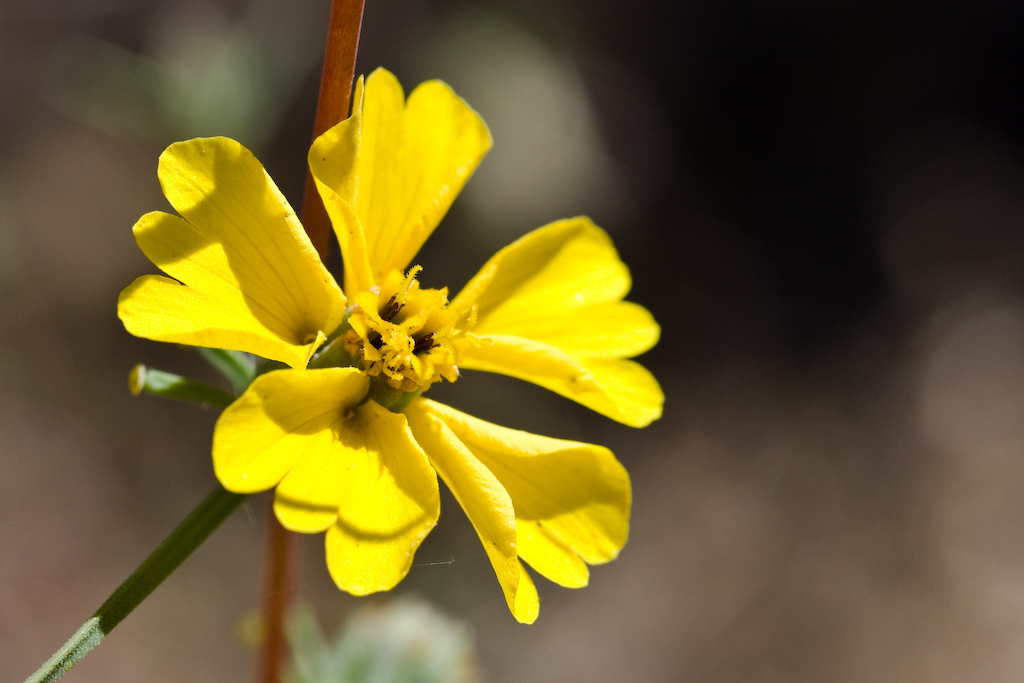

Scientific classification
- Kingdom: Plantae
- Clade: Tracheophytes
- Clade: Angiosperms
- Clade: Eudicots
- Clade: Asterids
- Order: Asterales
- Family: Asteraceae
- Genus: Calycadenia
- Species: C. truncata

Binomial name
- Calycadenia truncata DC.

Synonyms
- Calycadenia scabrella Greene; Calycadenia truncata var. scabrella (Drew) Jeps.; Calycadenia truncata subsp. scabrella (Drew) D.D.Keck; Hemizonia scabrella Drew; Hemizonia truncata (DC.) A.Gray; Lagophylla scabrella M.E.Jones

= Calycadenia truncata =

Species of flowering plant

Calycadenia truncata is a species of flowering plant in the family Asteraceae known by the common name Oregon western rosinweed. It is native to western North America.

Calycadenia truncata is an annual herb producing an erect, reddish stem, reaching up to 120 centimetres (47 inches) in height. The leaves are linear (long and very narrow) and up to 10 cm (4 in) long. Blooming from June to October, the inflorescence bears one or more flower heads about 2.5 cm (1 in) at separate nodes, surrounded by short bracts tipped with resin glands. The hairy flower heads have a center of many purple-tipped disc florets as well a few yellow ray florets 6–13 millimetres (1/4–1/2 in) in length. The fruit is an achene.

It is native to southwestern Oregon and northern and central California. It is found in the Cascades, the Coast Ranges, and the foothills of the Sierra Nevada as far south as Monterey and Tulare Counties. It thrives on dry and sunny grassy slopes.
