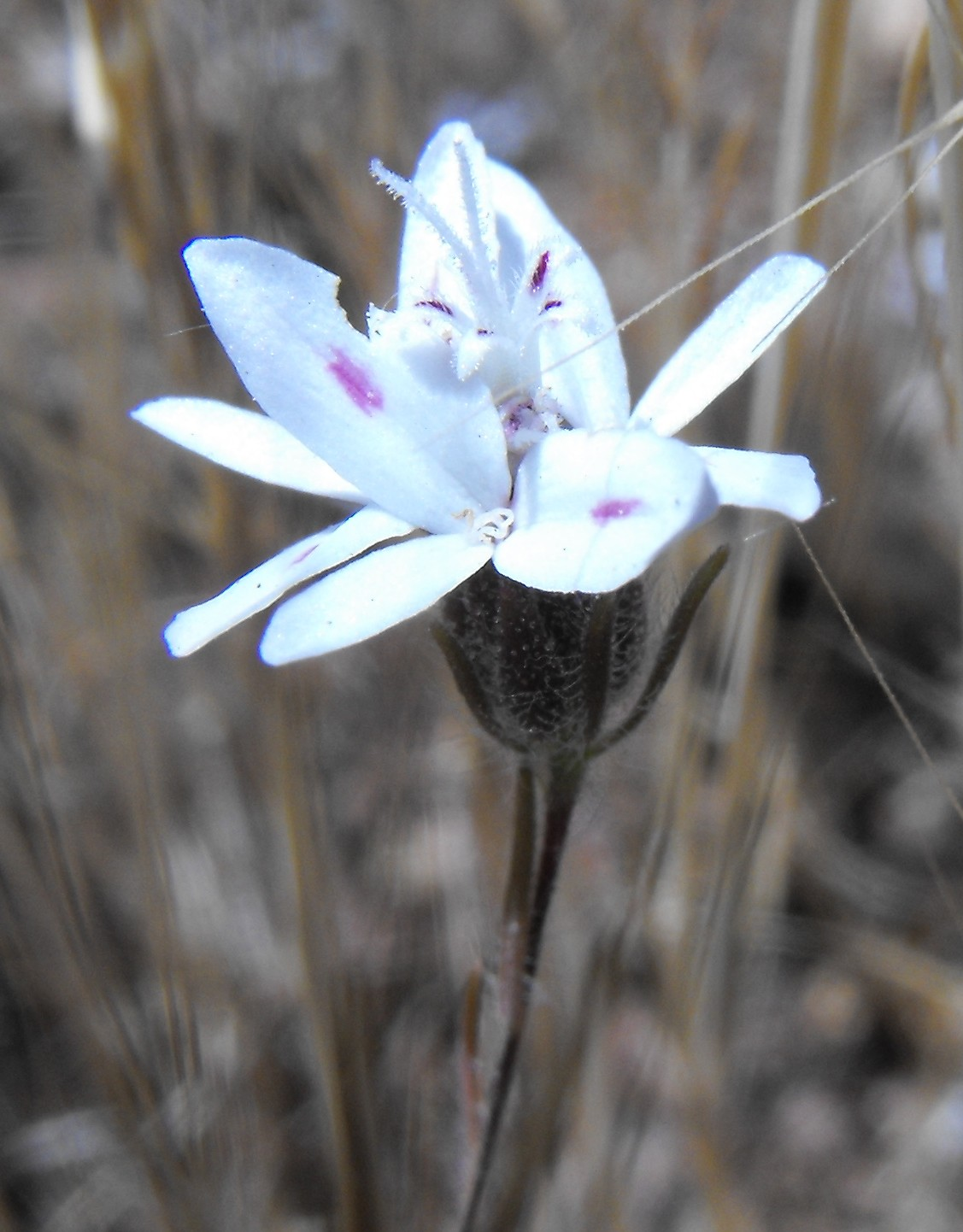

Scientific classification
- Kingdom: Plantae
- Clade: Tracheophytes
- Clade: Angiosperms
- Clade: Eudicots
- Clade: Asterids
- Order: Asterales
- Family: Asteraceae
- Subfamily: Asteroideae
- Tribe: Madieae
- Subtribe: Madiinae
- Genus: Osmadenia; Nutt.
- Species: O. tenella

Binomial name
- Osmadenia tenella Nutt.

Synonyms
- Calycadenia tenella (Nutt.) Torr. & A.Gray; Hemizonia tenella (Nutt.) A.Gray

= Osmadenia =

Genus of flowering plants

Osmadenia is a genus of flowering plants in the family Asteraceae. It contains the single species Osmadenia tenella, which is known by the common name false rosinweed.

== Distribution ==
Osmadenia tenella is native to the coastal plains and the hills and canyons of the Transverse Ranges in Southern California, and the Peninsular Ranges in Southern California and Baja California.

It is an uncommon member of the flora in local habitats, such as the coastal sage and chaparral and montane chaparral and woodlands sub-ecoregions.

== Description ==
Osmadenia tenella is a hairy, glandular, aromatic annual herb producing an erect stem approaching 40 centimeters (16 inches) in maximum height with threadlike branches. The linear leaves are alternately arranged, the largest low on the plant measuring up to 5 centimeters.

The inflorescence is a cyme of several flower heads. Each head has 3 to 5 three-lobed ray florets which are white or pink-tinged and often have a pink spot, and several narrower disc florets.

The fruit is an achene; those arising from disc florets have pappi.
