= Nicrophorus sausai =

Scientific classification
- Kingdom: Animalia
- Phylum: Arthropoda
- Class: Insecta
- Order: Coleoptera
- Suborder: Polyphaga
- Infraorder: Staphyliniformia
- Family: Staphylinidae
- Genus: Nicrophorus
- Species: N. sausai

Binomial name
- Nicrophorus sausai Růžička, Háva & Schneider, 2000

Species of beetle

Nicrophorus sausai is a burying beetle described by Jan Růžička, Jirí Háva and J. Schneider in 2000. It is known from Laos and northeastern India.
