= Nicrophorus cadaverinus =

Nicrophorus cadaverinus is not currently a valid species name, although the name has been applied independently to three different Nicrophorus species, each of which had already been described an alternate name:

- Nicrophorus vespillo, mistakenly described as the new species N. cadaverinus in 1807 by Johann Ludwig Christian Gravenhorst
- Nicrophorus vestigator, mistakenly described as the new subspecies N. sepultor cadaverinus in 1840 by Mareuse
- Nicrophorus germanicus, mistakenly described as the new species N. cadaverinus in 1857 by Gistel
