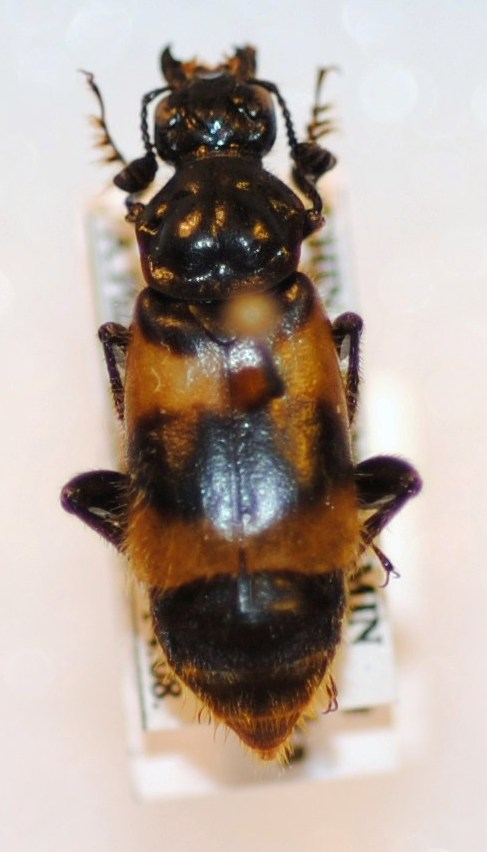

Scientific classification
- Kingdom: Animalia
- Phylum: Arthropoda
- Class: Insecta
- Order: Coleoptera
- Suborder: Polyphaga
- Infraorder: Staphyliniformia
- Family: Staphylinidae
- Genus: Nicrophorus
- Species: N. smefarka

Binomial name
- Nicrophorus smefarka Háva, Schneider & Růžička, 1999

= Nicrophorus smefarka =

Species of beetle

Nicrophorus smefarka is a burying beetle described by Jirí Háva, J. Schneider & Jan Růžička in 1999.
