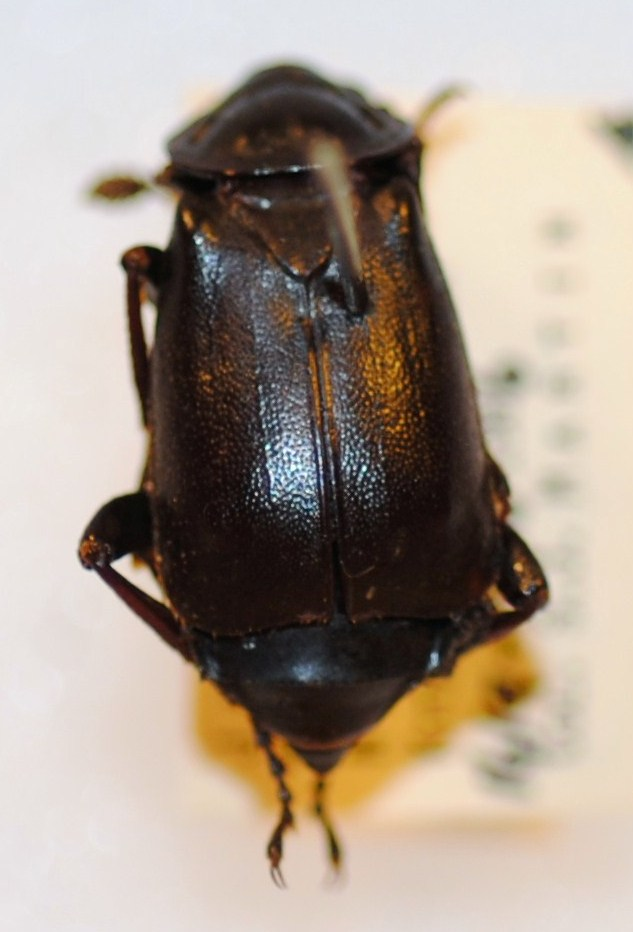

Scientific classification
- Kingdom: Animalia
- Phylum: Arthropoda
- Class: Insecta
- Order: Coleoptera
- Suborder: Polyphaga
- Infraorder: Staphyliniformia
- Family: Staphylinidae
- Genus: Nicrophorus
- Species: N. tenuipes

Binomial name
- Nicrophorus tenuipes Lewis, 1887

Synonyms
- Necrophorus [sic] tenuipes Lewis, 1887; Necrophorus [sic] fasciatus Hlisnikovský, 1932 (Preocc.); Necrophorus [sic] vicinus Shchegoleva-Barovskaya, 1933

= Nicrophorus tenuipes =

Species of beetle

Nicrophorus tenuipes is a burying beetle described by Lewis in 1887.
