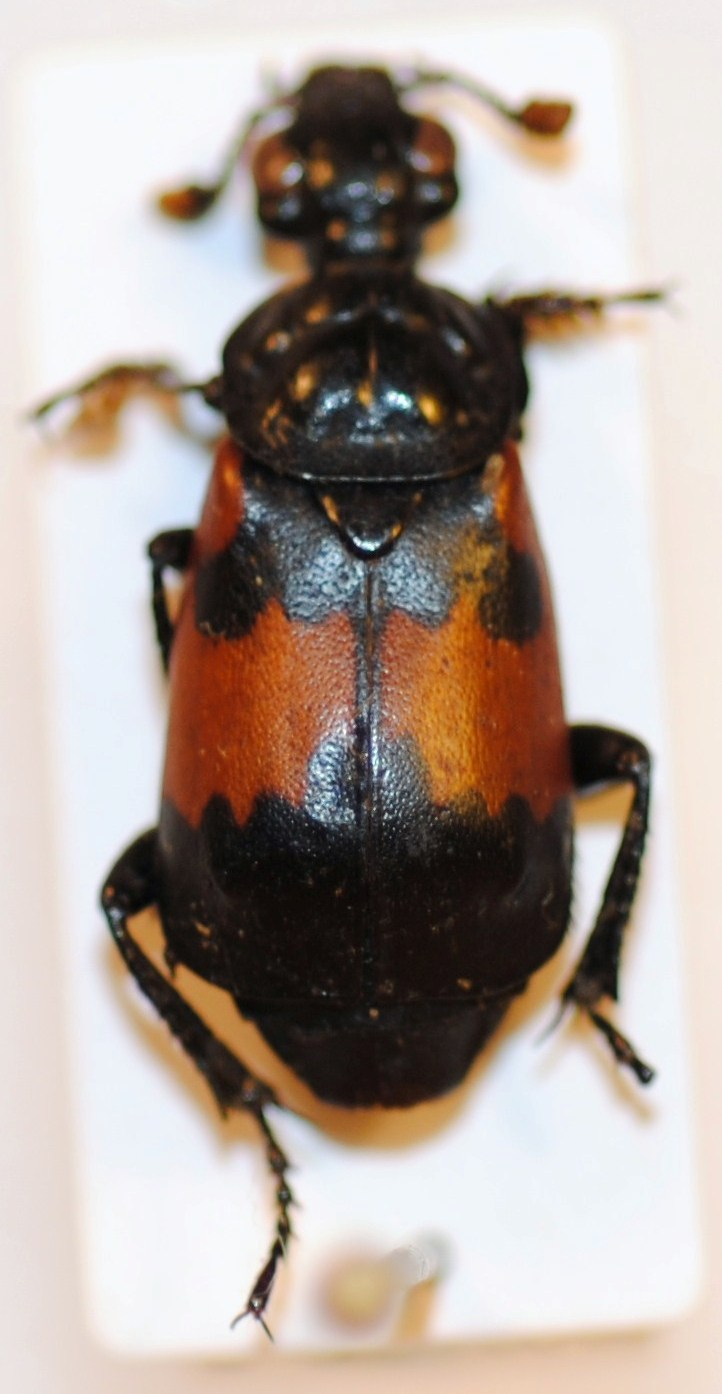
- Nicrophorus oberthuri

Scientific classification
- Kingdom: Animalia
- Phylum: Arthropoda
- Class: Insecta
- Order: Coleoptera
- Suborder: Polyphaga
- Infraorder: Staphyliniformia
- Family: Staphylinidae
- Genus: Nicrophorus
- Species: N. oberthuri

Binomial name
- Nicrophorus oberthuri Portevin, 1924

Synonyms
- Necrophorus [sic] Oberthuri Portevin, 1924; Necrophorus [sic] burmanicus Hlisnikovský, 1964; Necrophorus [sic] unifasciatus Hlisnikovský, 1964

= Nicrophorus oberthuri =

Species of beetle

Nicrophorus oberthuri is a burying beetle described by Gaston Portevin in 1924.
