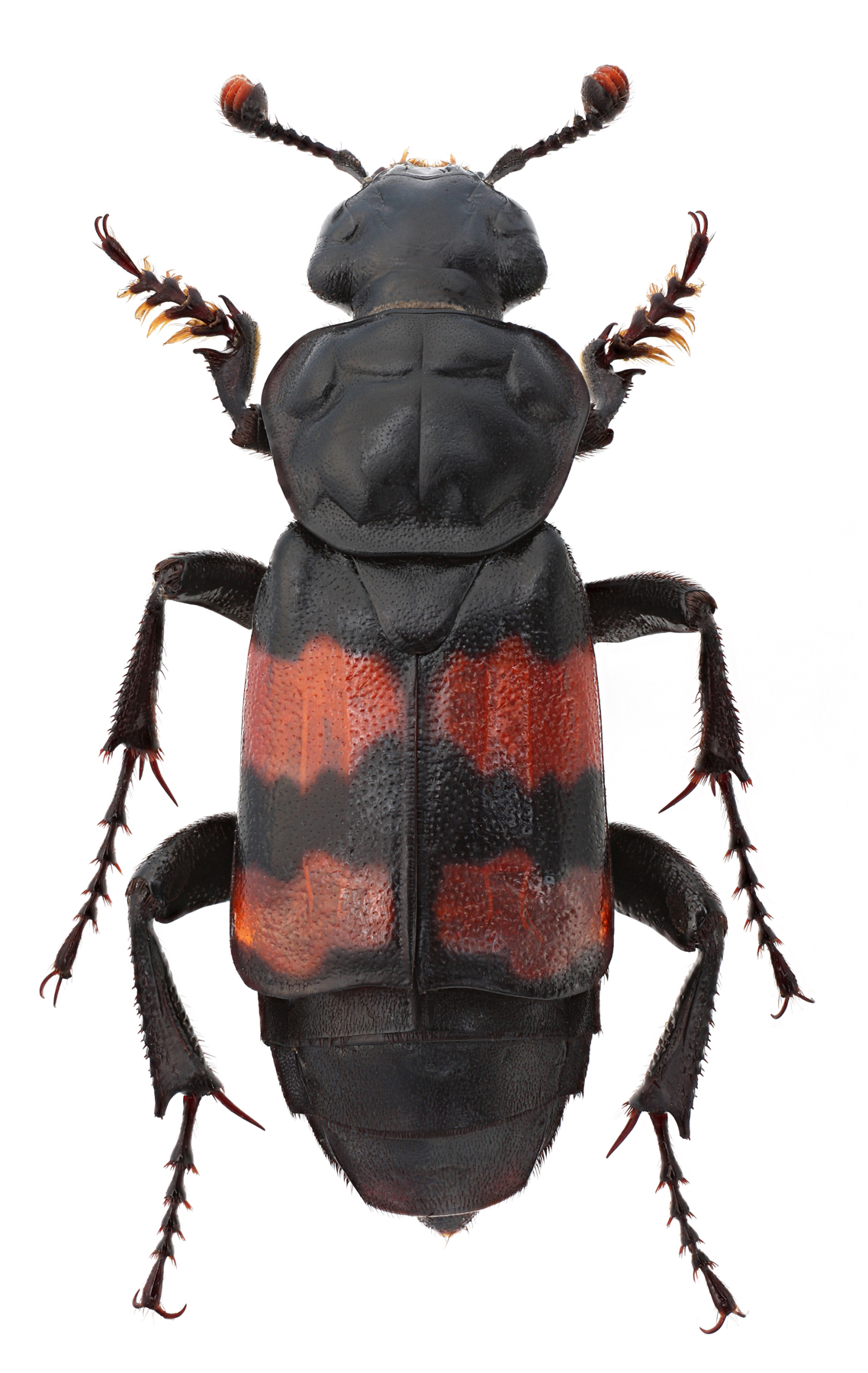

Scientific classification
- Kingdom: Animalia
- Phylum: Arthropoda
- Class: Insecta
- Order: Coleoptera
- Suborder: Polyphaga
- Infraorder: Staphyliniformia
- Family: Staphylinidae
- Genus: Nicrophorus
- Species: N. sepultor

Binomial name
- Nicrophorus sepultor Charpentier, 1825

Synonyms
- Necrophorus [sic] sepultor Charpentier, 1825; Necrophorus [sic] obrutor Erichson, 1837

= Nicrophorus sepultor =

Species of beetle

For the species misidentified by Gyllenhal in 1827 and declared a new species under the name Nicrophorus sepultor, but later corrected, see Nicrophorus vestigator

Nicrophorus sepultor is a burying beetle described by Toussaint de Charpentier in 1825. It has a Palearctic distribution from Europe to central Asia.
