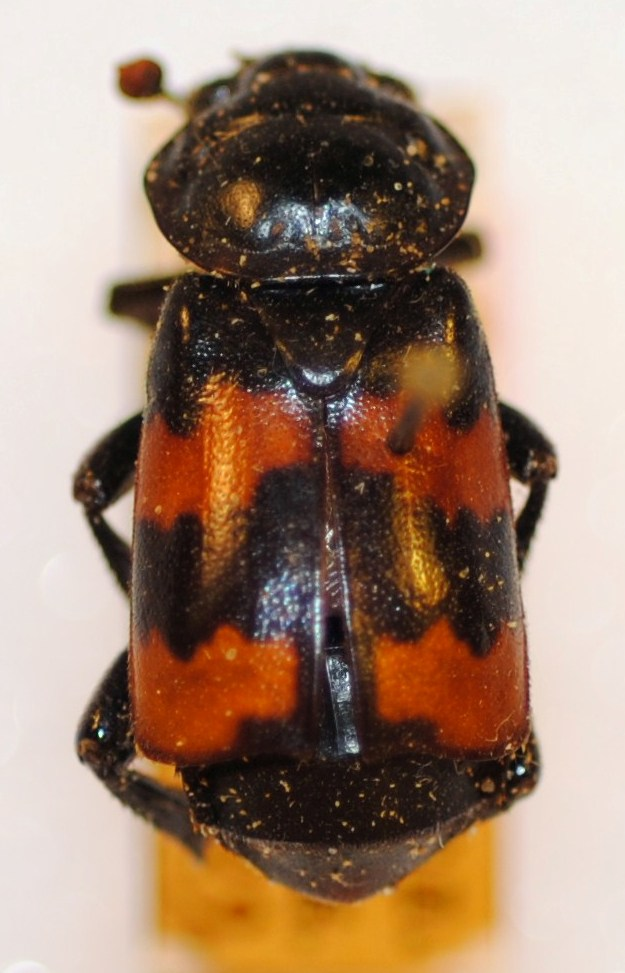
- Nicrophorus argutor

Scientific classification
- Kingdom: Animalia
- Phylum: Arthropoda
- Class: Insecta
- Order: Coleoptera
- Suborder: Polyphaga
- Infraorder: Staphyliniformia
- Family: Staphylinidae
- Genus: Nicrophorus
- Species: N. argutor

Binomial name
- Nicrophorus argutor Jakovlev, 1890

Synonyms
- Necrophorus [sic] argutor Jakovlev, 1891; Necrophorus [sic] sepultor v. pseudobrutor Reitter, 1895; Necrophorus [sic] tibetanus Hlisnikovský, 1964

= Nicrophorus argutor =

Species of beetle

Nicrophorus argutor is a species of burying beetle found in Russia, Mongolia, China and Kazakhstan.
