= N. frontalis =

N. frontalis may refer to:

- Neocallimastix frontalis, a species of fungus
- Nicrophorus frontalis, a synonym for Nicrophorus germanicus, a burying beetle species
- Nonnula frontalis, the grey-cheeked nunlet, a puffbird species found in Colombia and Panama
- Nervus frontalis or Frontal nerve, the largest branch of the ophthalmic nerve (V1)

== See also ==
- Frontalis (disambiguation)
