= Nicrophorus montivagus =

Scientific classification
- Kingdom: Animalia
- Phylum: Arthropoda
- Class: Insecta
- Order: Coleoptera
- Suborder: Polyphaga
- Infraorder: Staphyliniformia
- Family: Staphylinidae
- Genus: Nicrophorus
- Species: N. montivagus

Binomial name
- Nicrophorus montivagus Lewis, 1887

Synonyms
- Necrophorus [sic] montivagus Lewis, 1887; Necrophorus [sic] mixtus Hlisnikovský, 1964

Species of beetle

Nicrophorus montivagus is a burying beetle described by Lewis in 1887.
