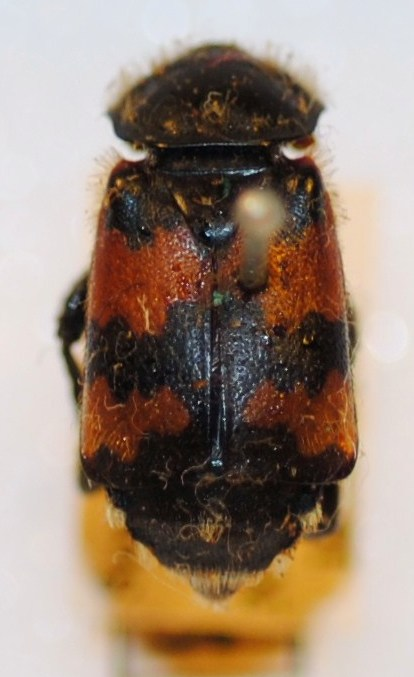

Scientific classification
- Kingdom: Animalia
- Phylum: Arthropoda
- Class: Insecta
- Order: Coleoptera
- Suborder: Polyphaga
- Infraorder: Staphyliniformia
- Family: Staphylinidae
- Genus: Nicrophorus
- Species: N. antennatus

Binomial name
- Nicrophorus antennatus (Reitter, 1884)

Synonyms
- Silpha antennata Reitter, 1884; Necrophorus [sic] antennatus v. centralis Portevin, 1914

= Nicrophorus antennatus =

Species of beetle

Nicrophorus antennatus is a species of burying beetle, first described scientifically by Edmund Reitter in 1884. It has a wide distribution across the Palearctic and occurs between central Europe, China, and India.
