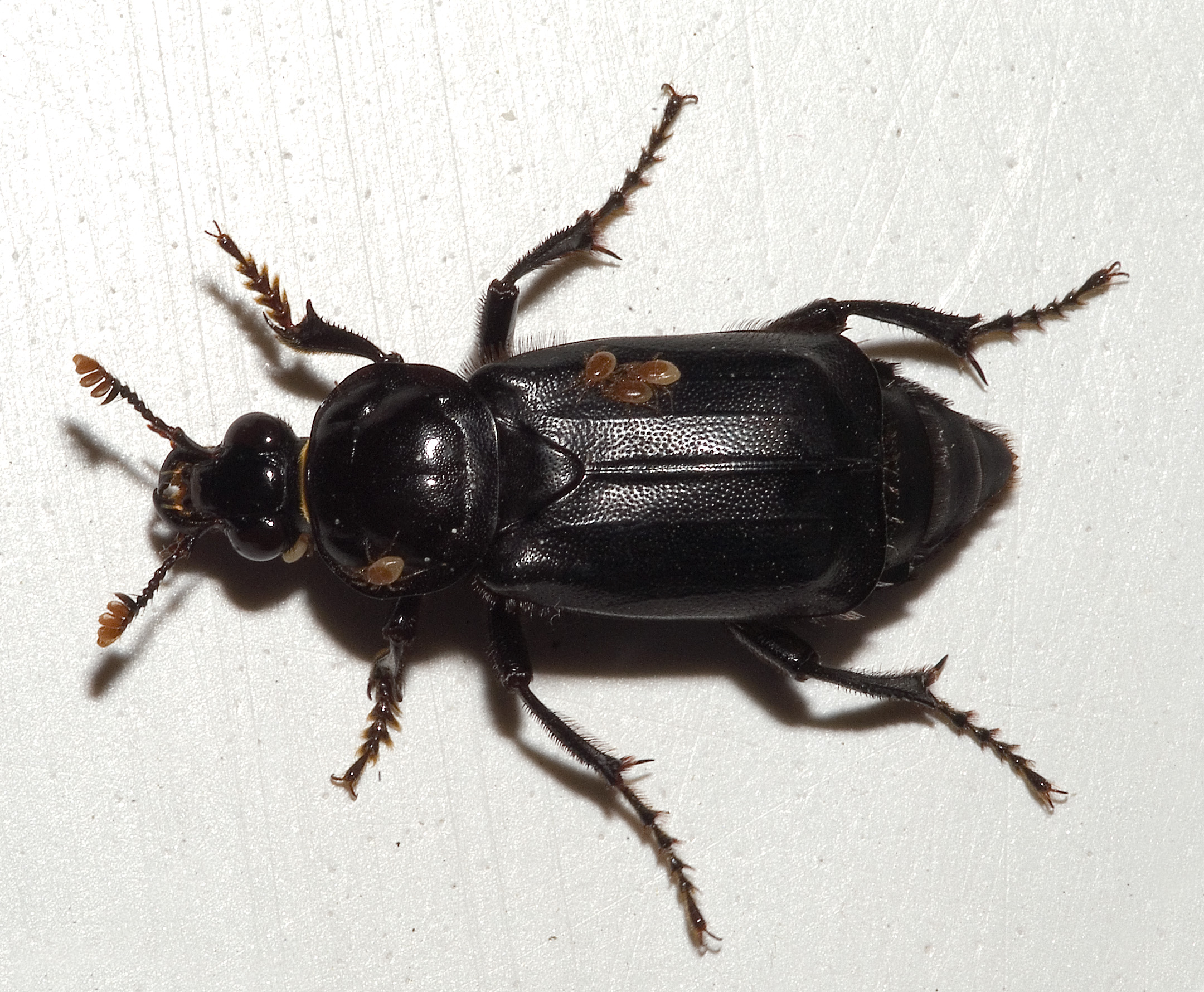

Scientific classification
- Kingdom: Animalia
- Phylum: Arthropoda
- Class: Insecta
- Order: Coleoptera
- Suborder: Polyphaga
- Infraorder: Staphyliniformia
- Family: Staphylinidae
- Genus: Nicrophorus
- Species: N. humator

Binomial name
- Nicrophorus humator (Gleditsch, 1767)

Synonyms
- Silpha humator Gleditsch, 1767; Necrophorus [sic] sulcatus Fischer von Waldheim, 1844; Necrophorus [sic] nigerrimus Kraatz, 1884; Necrophorus [sic] humator v. atricornis Meier, 1899; Necrophorus [sic] humator v. maculosus Meier, 1899

= Nicrophorus humator =

Nicrophorus humator Temporal range: .0105–Recent Ma

Species of beetle

Nicrophorus humator is a burying beetle described by Gleditsch in 1767 (as Silpha humator). It has a Palearctic distribution, including North Africa. A fossil dating to around 10,500 years ago was described in 1962 by Pearson.
