= Nicrophorus carolina =

Scientific classification
- Kingdom: Animalia
- Phylum: Arthropoda
- Class: Insecta
- Order: Coleoptera
- Suborder: Polyphaga
- Infraorder: Staphyliniformia
- Family: Staphylinidae
- Genus: Nicrophorus
- Species: N. carolina

Binomial name
- Nicrophorus carolina (Linnaeus, 1771)

Synonyms
- Silpha carolina Linnaeus, 1771; Necrophorus [sic] mediatus Fabricius, 1801; Necrophorus [sic] medianus Leach & Nodder, 1815 (misspelling); Necrophorus [sic] mysticallis Angell, 1912; Necrocharis carolinus v. dolosus Portevin, 1923; Nicrophorus carolinus floridae Brimley, 1938

Species of beetle

Nicrophorus carolina is a burying beetle described by Carl Linnaeus in 1771. Its specific name has commonly been misspelled as carolinus.
