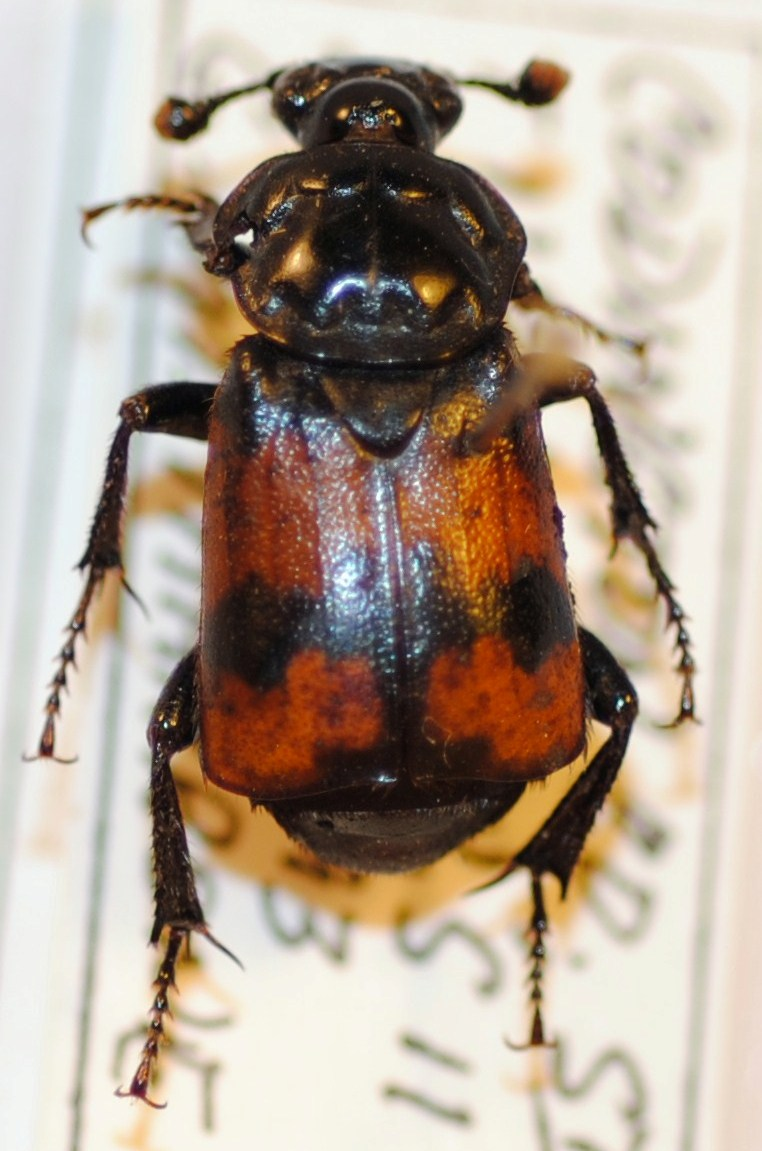

Scientific classification
- Kingdom: Animalia
- Phylum: Arthropoda
- Class: Insecta
- Order: Coleoptera
- Suborder: Polyphaga
- Infraorder: Staphyliniformia
- Family: Staphylinidae
- Genus: Nicrophorus
- Species: N. hybridus

Binomial name
- Nicrophorus hybridus Hatch & Angell, 1925

Synonyms
- N. h. minnesotianus, Hatch, 1927

= Nicrophorus hybridus =

Species of beetle

Nicrophorus hybridus is a species of burying beetle that was first described by Melville Hatch and John W. Angell in 1925.
