= Nicrophorus guttula =

Scientific classification
- Kingdom: Animalia
- Phylum: Arthropoda
- Class: Insecta
- Order: Coleoptera
- Suborder: Polyphaga
- Infraorder: Staphyliniformia
- Family: Staphylinidae
- Genus: Nicrophorus
- Species: N. guttula

Binomial name
- Nicrophorus guttula Motschulsky, 1845

Synonyms
- Necrophorus [sic] guttula Motschulsky, 1845; Necrophorus [sic] auripilosus Eschscholtz, 1845 Nom. Nud.; Necrophorus [sic] Hecate Bland, 1865; Necrophorus [sic] guttula v. vandykei Angell, 1920; Necrophorus [sic] guttula v. quadriguttata Angell, 1920; Nicrophorus guttula punctostriatus Pierce, 1949; Necrophorus [sic] hecate immaculosis Hatch, 1957

Species of beetle

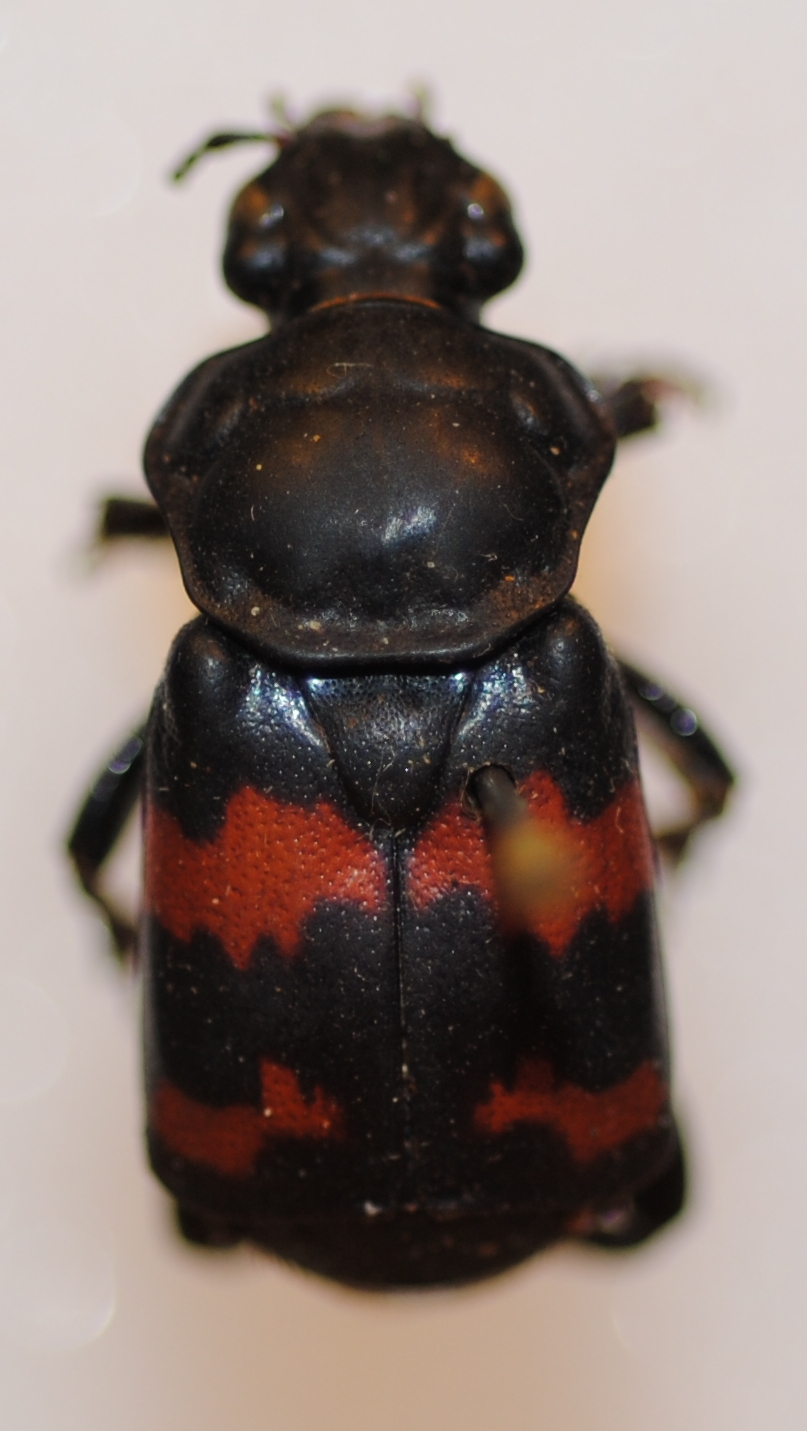
Nicrophorus guttula

Nicrophorus guttula is a burying beetle described by Victor Motschulsky in 1845.
