= Nicrophorus nigricornis =

Scientific classification
- Kingdom: Animalia
- Phylum: Arthropoda
- Class: Insecta
- Order: Coleoptera
- Suborder: Polyphaga
- Infraorder: Staphyliniformia
- Family: Staphylinidae
- Genus: Nicrophorus
- Species: N. nigricornis

Binomial name
- Nicrophorus nigricornis Faldermann, 1835

Synonyms
- Silpha nigricornis, Reitter, 1884

Species of beetle

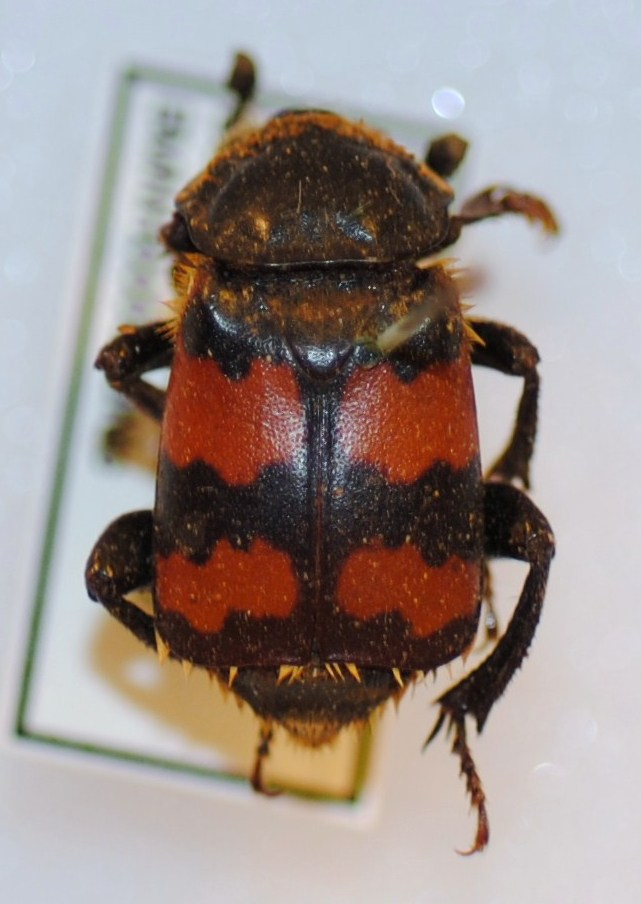
Nicrophorus nigricornis specimen

Nicrophorus nigricornis is a burying beetle described by Faldermann in 1835.
