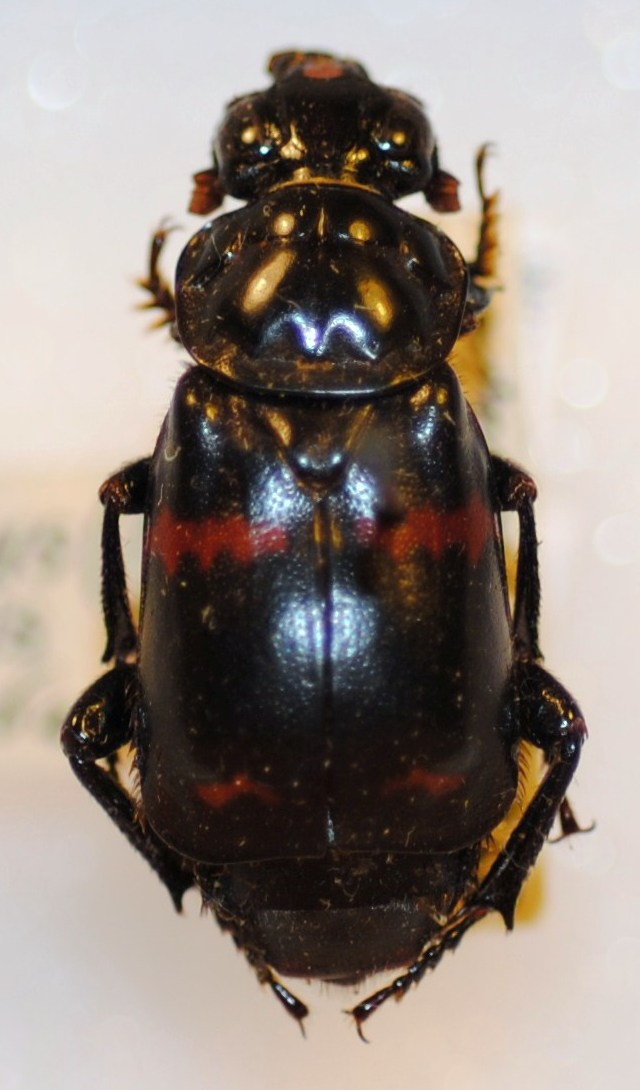
- Image of Nicrophorus ussuriensis

Scientific classification
- Kingdom: Animalia
- Phylum: Arthropoda
- Class: Insecta
- Order: Coleoptera
- Suborder: Polyphaga
- Infraorder: Staphyliniformia
- Family: Staphylinidae
- Genus: Nicrophorus
- Species: N. ussuriensis

Binomial name
- Nicrophorus ussuriensis Portevin, 1923

= Nicrophorus ussuriensis =

Species of beetle

Nicrophorus ussuriensis is a burying beetle described by Portevin in 1923.
