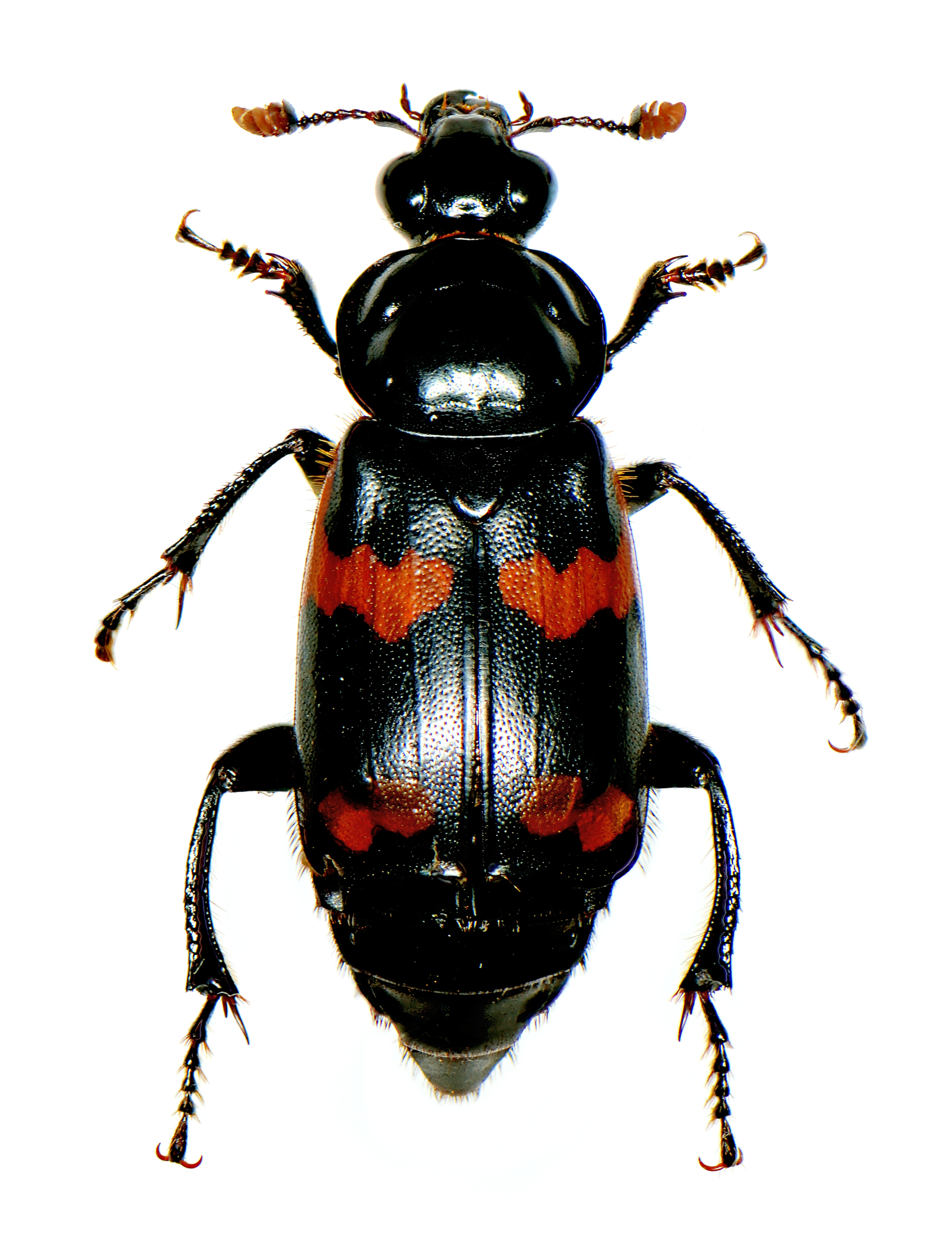

Scientific classification
- Kingdom: Animalia
- Phylum: Arthropoda
- Class: Insecta
- Order: Coleoptera
- Suborder: Polyphaga
- Infraorder: Staphyliniformia
- Family: Staphylinidae
- Genus: Nicrophorus
- Species: N. sayi

Binomial name
- Nicrophorus sayi Laporte, 1840

Synonyms
- Necrophorus [sic] pulsator, Gistel, 1848; Necrophorus [sic] lunatus, LeConte, 1853; Necrophorus [sic] luniger, Harold, 1868

= Nicrophorus sayi =

Species of beetle

Nicrophorus sayi is a burying beetle described by Laporte in 1840.
