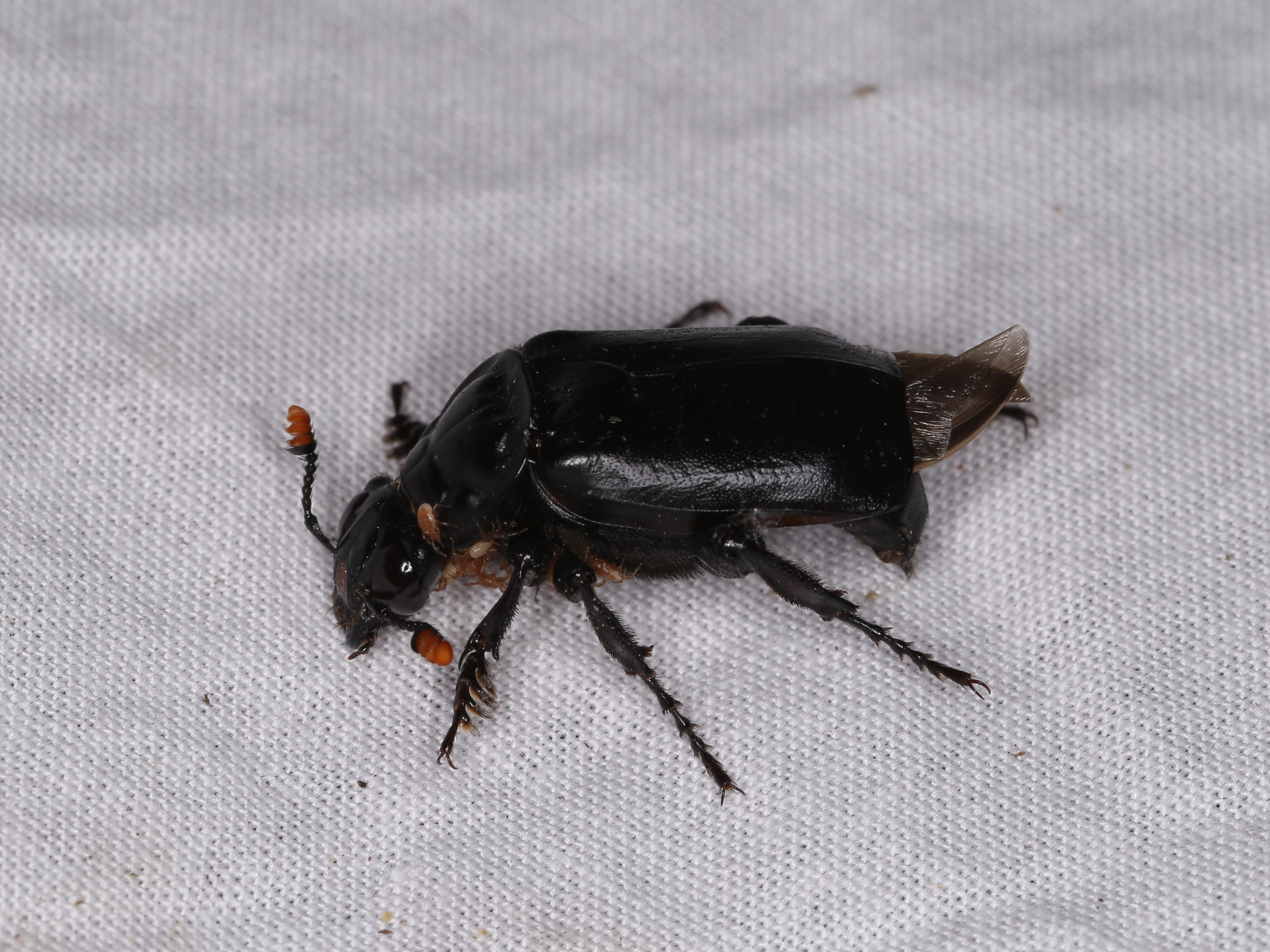

Scientific classification
- Kingdom: Animalia
- Phylum: Arthropoda
- Clade: Pancrustacea
- Class: Insecta
- Order: Coleoptera
- Suborder: Polyphaga
- Infraorder: Staphyliniformia
- Family: Staphylinidae
- Genus: Nicrophorus
- Species: N. nigrita

Binomial name
- Nicrophorus nigrita Mannerheim, 1843

Synonyms
- Necrophorus [sic] nigrita Mannerheim, 1843; Necrophorus [sic] lateralis Eschscholtz, 1845 (Nom. Nud.); Nicrophorus ruficornis Motschulsky, 1870; Nicrophorus investigator alpha Pierce, 1949

= Nicrophorus nigrita =

Species of beetle

Nicrophorus nigrita, or the black burying beetle, is a burying beetle described by Mannerheim in 1843. It is found along the west coast of North America, from British Columbia to Baja California, inland through Nevada. Unlike other Nearctic burying beetles, it does not have markings on its elytra. Instead, it is mostly black, with red-orange clubs on its antennae. Adults are 12–28 millimetres (0.47–1.10 in) in length.

== Behavior ==
Nicrophorus nigrita eat carrion of small vertebrates, such as mice. The beetles coat the carcass in antimicrobial saliva to slow decay. After mating, A pair of beetles will work together to bury a fresh carcass and the female will lay her eggs in this brood chamber. Unlike most insects, both parents will remain with the brood to protect and feed their offspring.

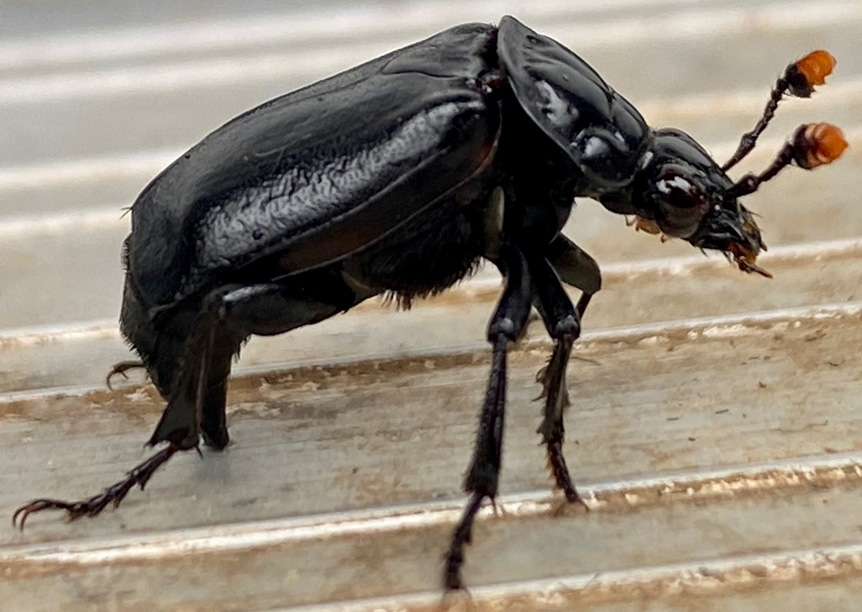
Nicrophorus nigrita found in Oregon

== Symbiotic Mutualism ==
These beetles are usually seen covered in mites (mostly in the genera Poecilochirus and Pelzneria). The beetles and the phoretic mites have a symbiotic relationship. The beetles transport the mites between food sources where they eat the fly eggs that would otherwise compete with the beetle's larva.
