= Nicrophorus chilensis =

Scientific classification
- Kingdom: Animalia
- Phylum: Arthropoda
- Class: Insecta
- Order: Coleoptera
- Suborder: Polyphaga
- Infraorder: Staphyliniformia
- Family: Staphylinidae
- Genus: Nicrophorus
- Species: N. chilensis

Binomial name
- Nicrophorus chilensis Philippi, 1871

Species of beetle

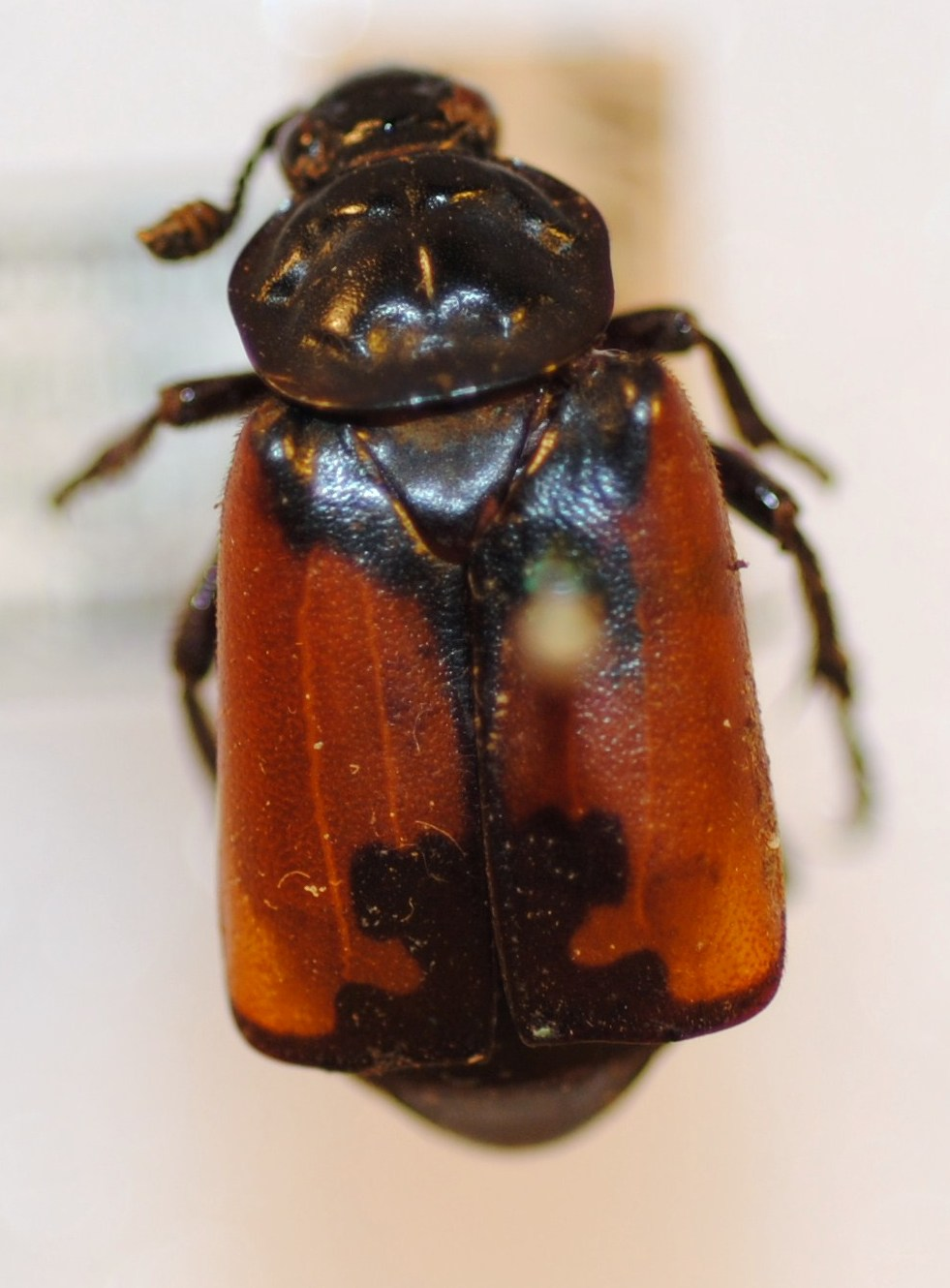

Nicrophorus chilensis is a burying beetle described by Philippi in 1871.
