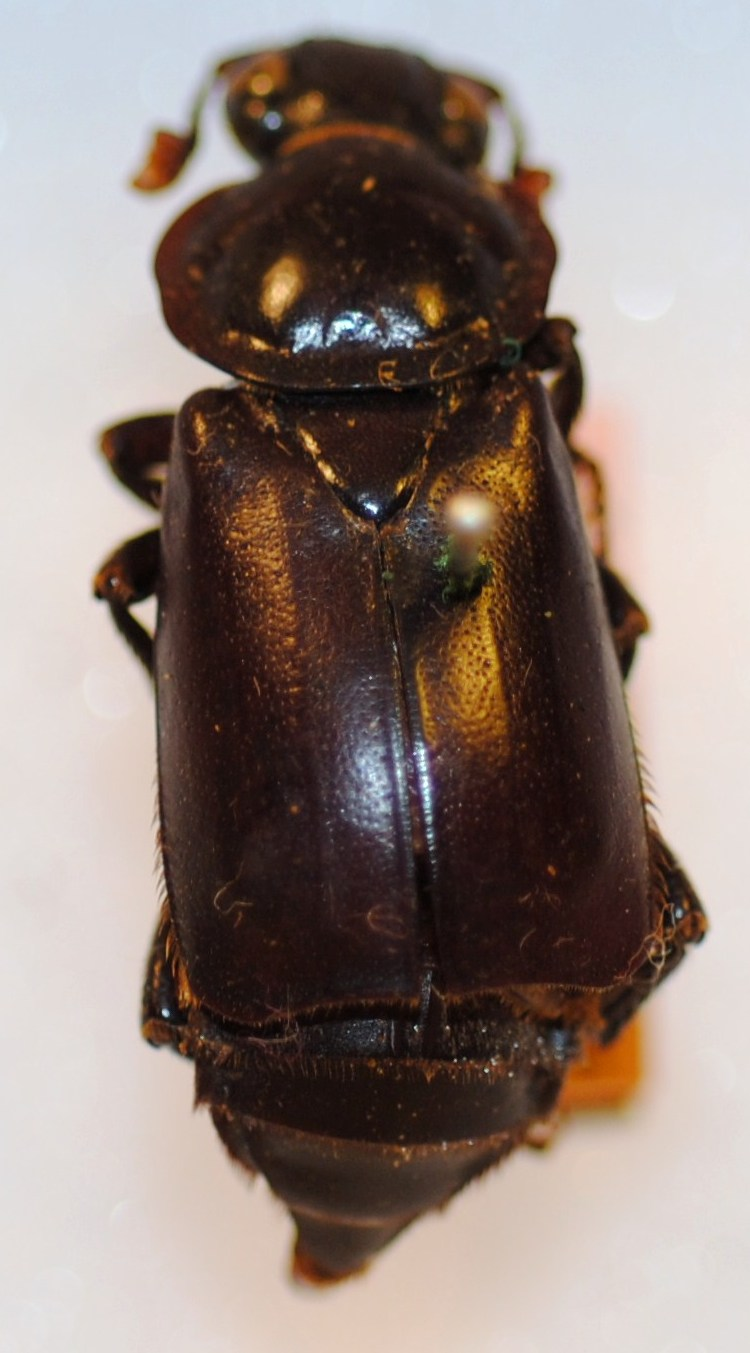

Scientific classification
- Kingdom: Animalia
- Phylum: Arthropoda
- Class: Insecta
- Order: Coleoptera
- Suborder: Polyphaga
- Infraorder: Staphyliniformia
- Family: Staphylinidae
- Genus: Nicrophorus
- Species: N. satanas

Binomial name
- Nicrophorus satanas Reitter, 1893

Synonyms
- N. satana – Nishikawa, 1986

= Nicrophorus satanas =

Species of beetle

Nicrophorus satanas is a burying beetle described by Edmund Reitter in 1893.

== General Characteristics ==
Nicrophorus satanas is a burying beetle commonly found in Europe and Asia. They can measure between 2.5 and 3.8 cm. They have thick bodies with a black exterior.
