= Nicrophorus concolor =

Scientific classification
- Kingdom: Animalia
- Phylum: Arthropoda
- Clade: Pancrustacea
- Class: Insecta
- Order: Coleoptera
- Suborder: Polyphaga
- Infraorder: Staphyliniformia
- Family: Staphylinidae
- Genus: Nicrophorus
- Species: N. concolor

Binomial name
- Nicrophorus concolor Kraatz, 1877

Synonyms
- Necrophorus [sic] concolor Kraatz, 1877; Necrophorus [sic] rotundicollis Portevin, 1923

Species of beetle

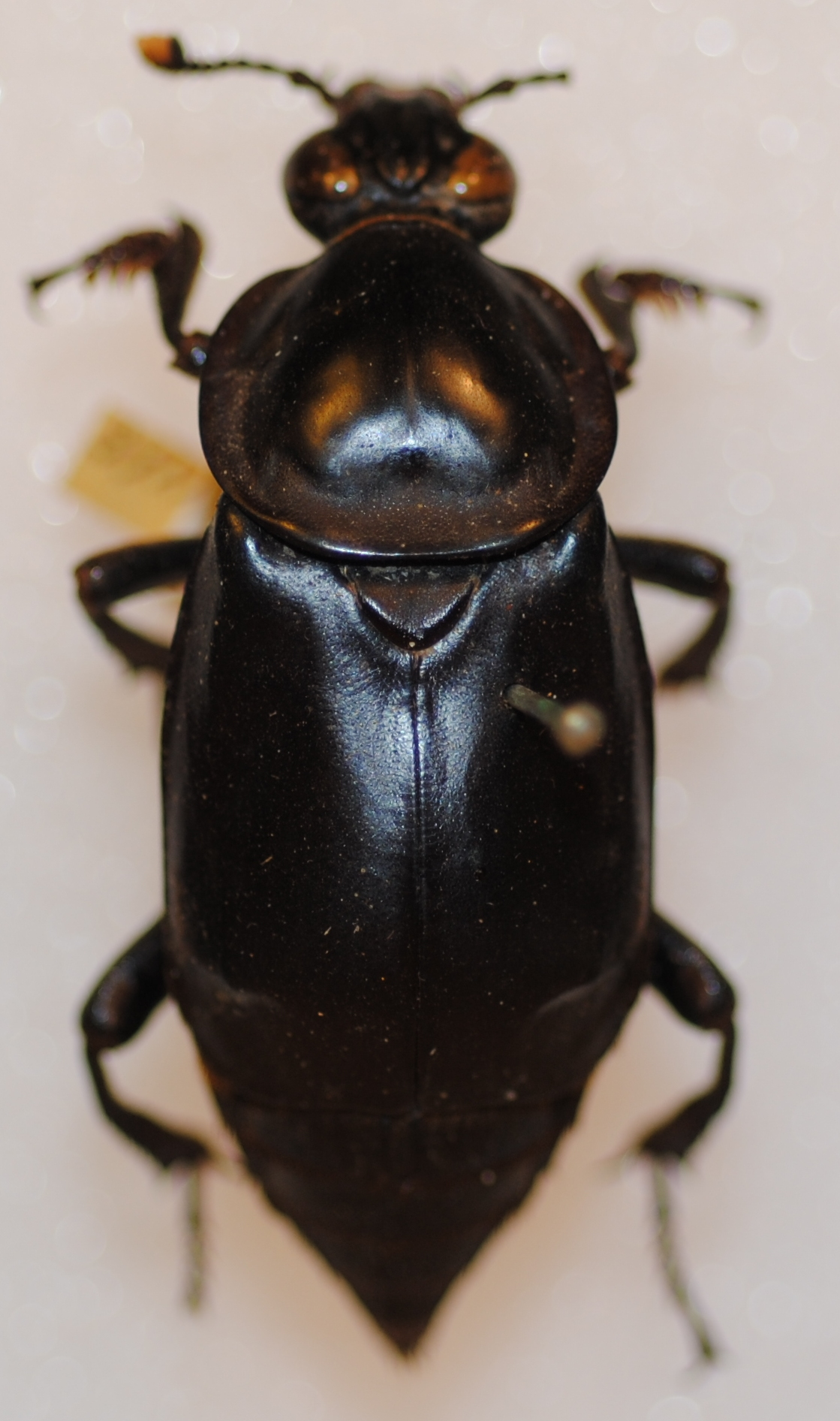
Picture of Nicrophorus concolor Kraatz

Nicrophorus concolor is a burying beetle described by Kraatz in 1877.
