= Nicrophorus heurni =

Scientific classification
- Kingdom: Animalia
- Phylum: Arthropoda
- Class: Insecta
- Order: Coleoptera
- Suborder: Polyphaga
- Infraorder: Staphyliniformia
- Family: Staphylinidae
- Genus: Nicrophorus
- Species: N. heurni

Binomial name
- Nicrophorus heurni Portevin, 1926

Synonyms
- N. h. portevin, Sikes & Peck, 2000

Species of beetle

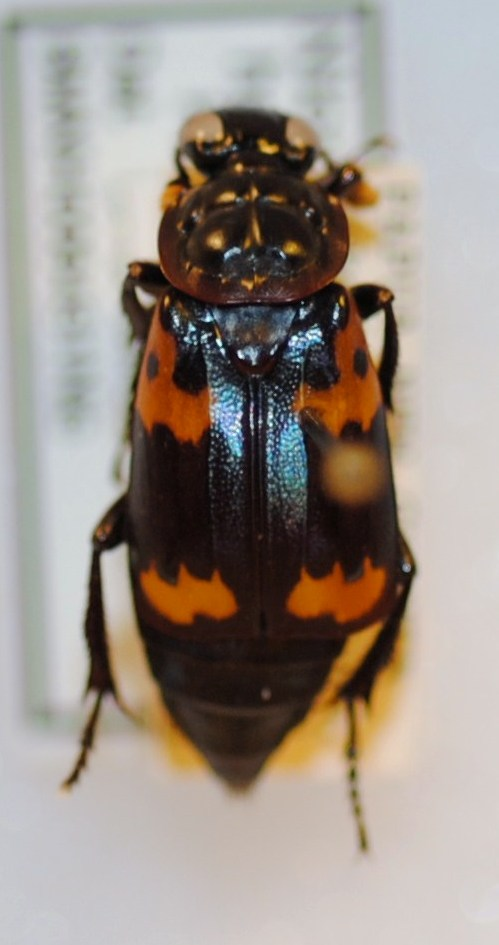
Photo by Luxmmi Varathan & Craig Perl.

Nicrophorus heurni is a burying beetle that lives in Australia and New Guinea.
