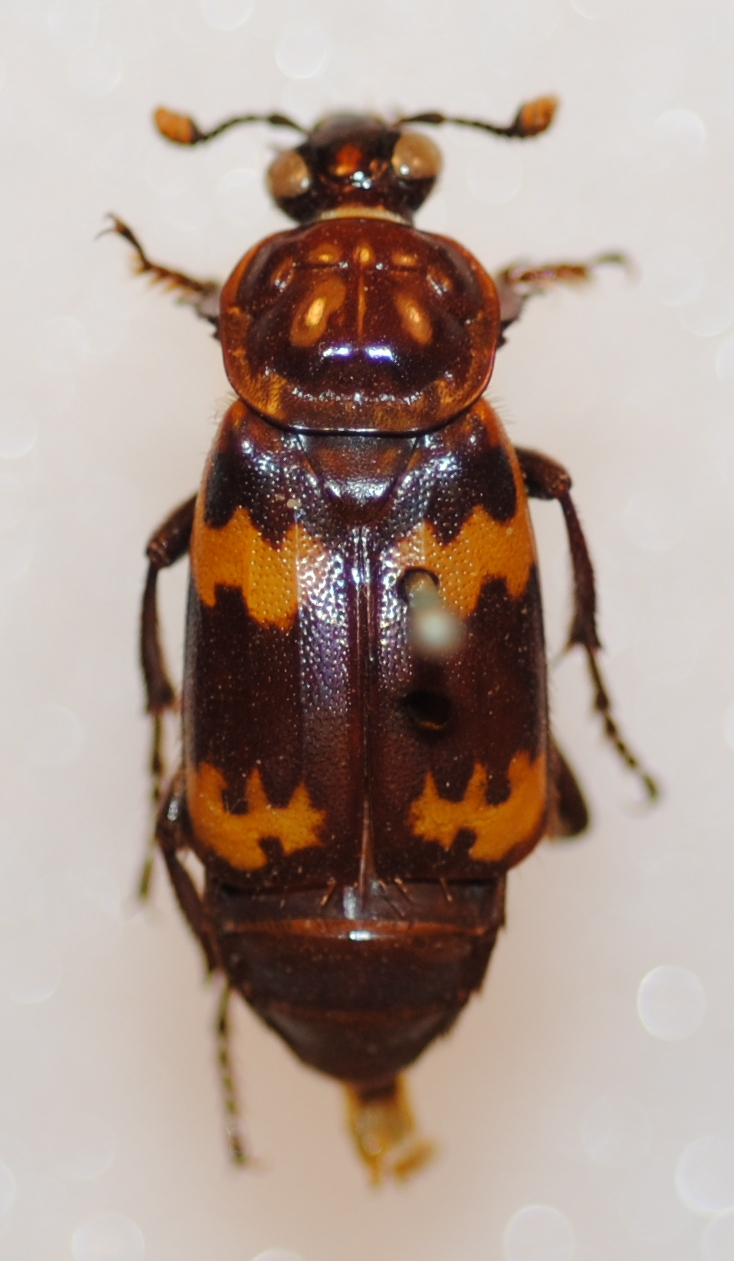

Scientific classification
- Kingdom: Animalia
- Phylum: Arthropoda
- Clade: Pancrustacea
- Class: Insecta
- Order: Coleoptera
- Suborder: Polyphaga
- Infraorder: Staphyliniformia
- Family: Staphylinidae
- Genus: Nicrophorus
- Species: N. maculifrons

Binomial name
- Nicrophorus maculifrons Kraatz, 1877

Synonyms
- Necrophorus [sic] maculifrons Kraatz, 1877; Silpha maculiceps Jakovlev, 1887; Necrophorus [sic] maculifrons parvulus Hlisnikovsky, 1964

= Nicrophorus maculifrons =

Species of beetle

Nicrophorus maculifrons is a burying beetle described by Kraatz in 1877.
