= Nicrophorus scrutator =

Scientific classification
- Kingdom: Animalia
- Phylum: Arthropoda
- Class: Insecta
- Order: Coleoptera
- Suborder: Polyphaga
- Infraorder: Staphyliniformia
- Family: Staphylinidae
- Genus: Nicrophorus
- Species: N. scrutator

Binomial name
- Nicrophorus scrutator Blanchard, 1842

Species of beetle

Nicrophorus scrutator is a burying beetle described by Émile Blanchard in 1842. It occurs in South America, with records from Peru, Bolivia, and northern Argentina.
