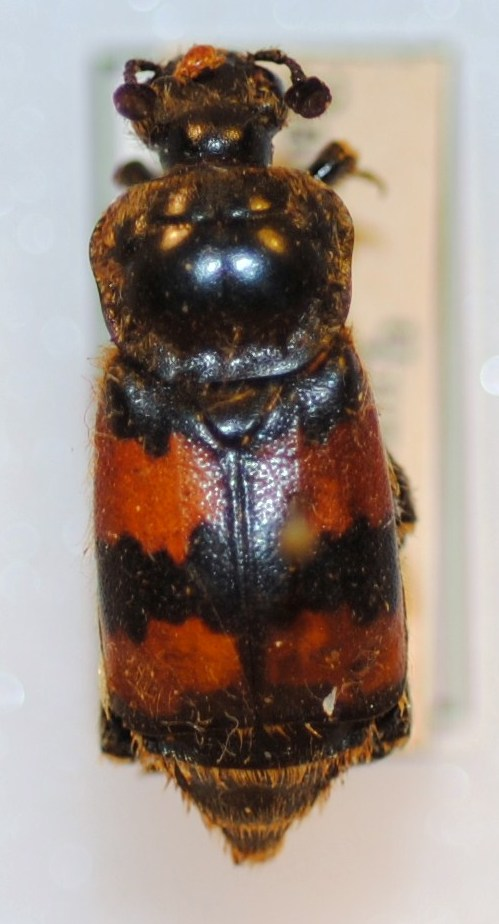

Scientific classification
- Kingdom: Animalia
- Phylum: Arthropoda
- Class: Insecta
- Order: Coleoptera
- Suborder: Polyphaga
- Infraorder: Staphyliniformia
- Family: Staphylinidae
- Genus: Nicrophorus
- Species: N. dauricus

Binomial name
- Nicrophorus dauricus Motschulsky, 1860

Synonyms
- Necrophorus [sic] dauricus Motschulsky, 1860; Necrophorus [sic] orientalis Motschulsky, 1860 (Preocc.)

= Nicrophorus dauricus =

Species of beetle

Nicrophorus dauricus is a burying beetle described by Victor Motschulsky, a Russian entomologist, in 1860.
