= Nicrophorus sepulchralis =

Scientific classification
- Kingdom: Animalia
- Phylum: Arthropoda
- Clade: Pancrustacea
- Class: Insecta
- Order: Coleoptera
- Suborder: Polyphaga
- Infraorder: Staphyliniformia
- Family: Staphylinidae
- Genus: Nicrophorus
- Species: N. sepulchralis

Binomial name
- Nicrophorus sepulchralis Heer, 1841

Synonyms
- Necrophorus sepulchralis Heer, 1841; Silpha sepulchralis – Reitter, 1884

Species of beetle

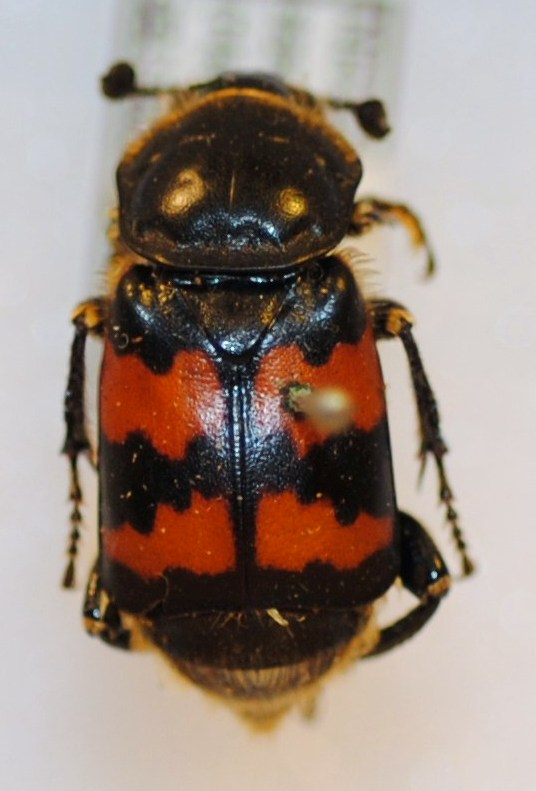
Nicrophorus sepulchralis.

Nicrophorus sepulchralis is a burying beetle described by Oswald Heer in 1841. It is endemic to the mountains of southern Europe.
