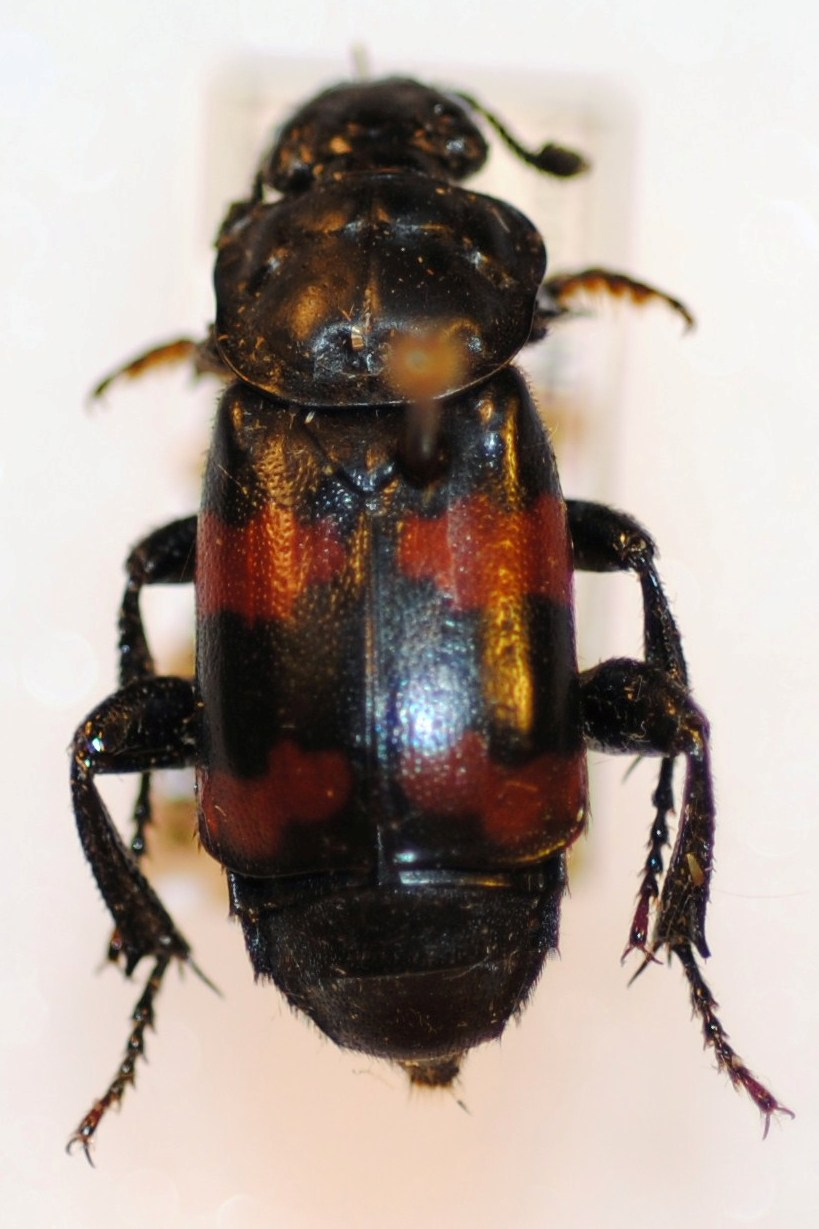

Scientific classification
- Kingdom: Animalia
- Phylum: Arthropoda
- Class: Insecta
- Order: Coleoptera
- Suborder: Polyphaga
- Infraorder: Staphyliniformia
- Family: Staphylinidae
- Genus: Nicrophorus
- Species: N. validus

Binomial name
- Nicrophorus validus Portevin, 1920

Synonyms
- N. (Necrophorindus) validus, Semenov-Tian-Shanskij, 1933

= Nicrophorus validus =

Species of beetle

Nicrophorus validus is a burying beetle described by Portevin in 1920 and distributed in the Himalayas, Nepal, and Tibet.

== See also ==
Nicrophorus quadripunctuatus
