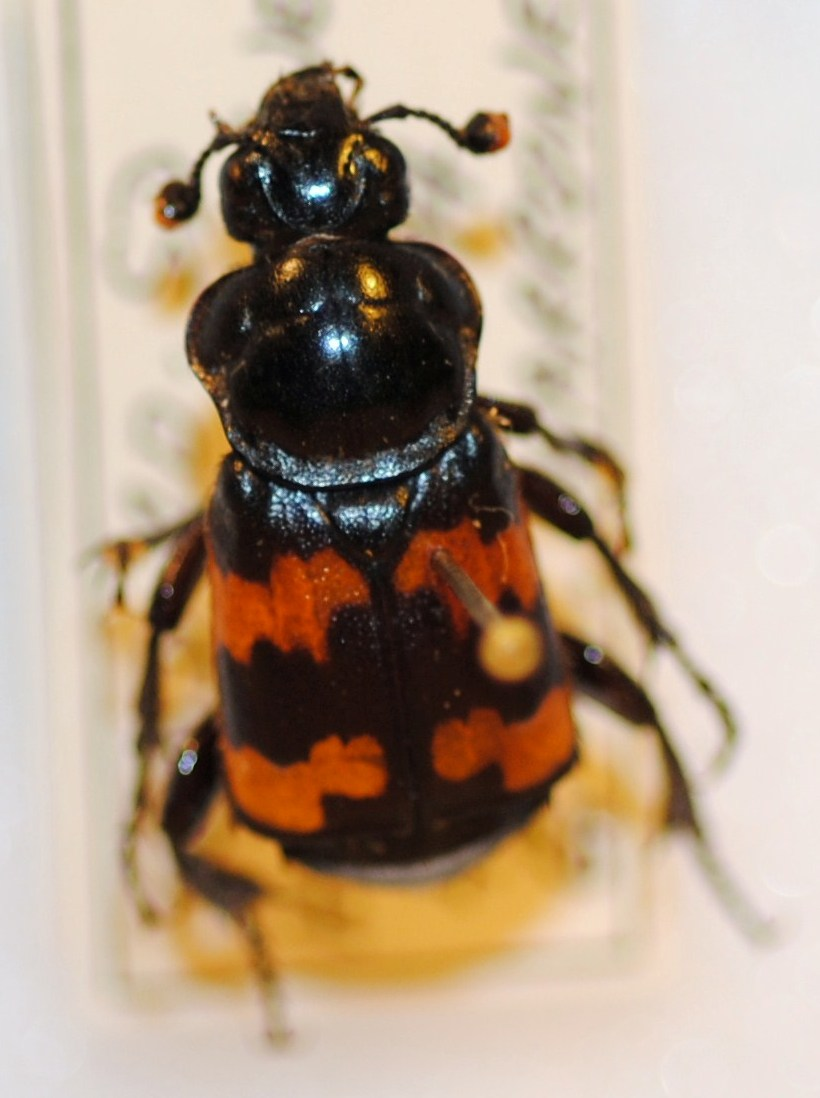

Scientific classification
- Kingdom: Animalia
- Phylum: Arthropoda
- Class: Insecta
- Order: Coleoptera
- Suborder: Polyphaga
- Infraorder: Staphyliniformia
- Family: Staphylinidae
- Genus: Nicrophorus
- Species: N. obscurus

Binomial name
- Nicrophorus obscurus Kirby, 1837

Synonyms
- Silpha obscura, Crotch, 1873

= Nicrophorus obscurus =

Species of beetle

Nicrophorus obscurus is a burying beetle described by William Kirby in 1837.
