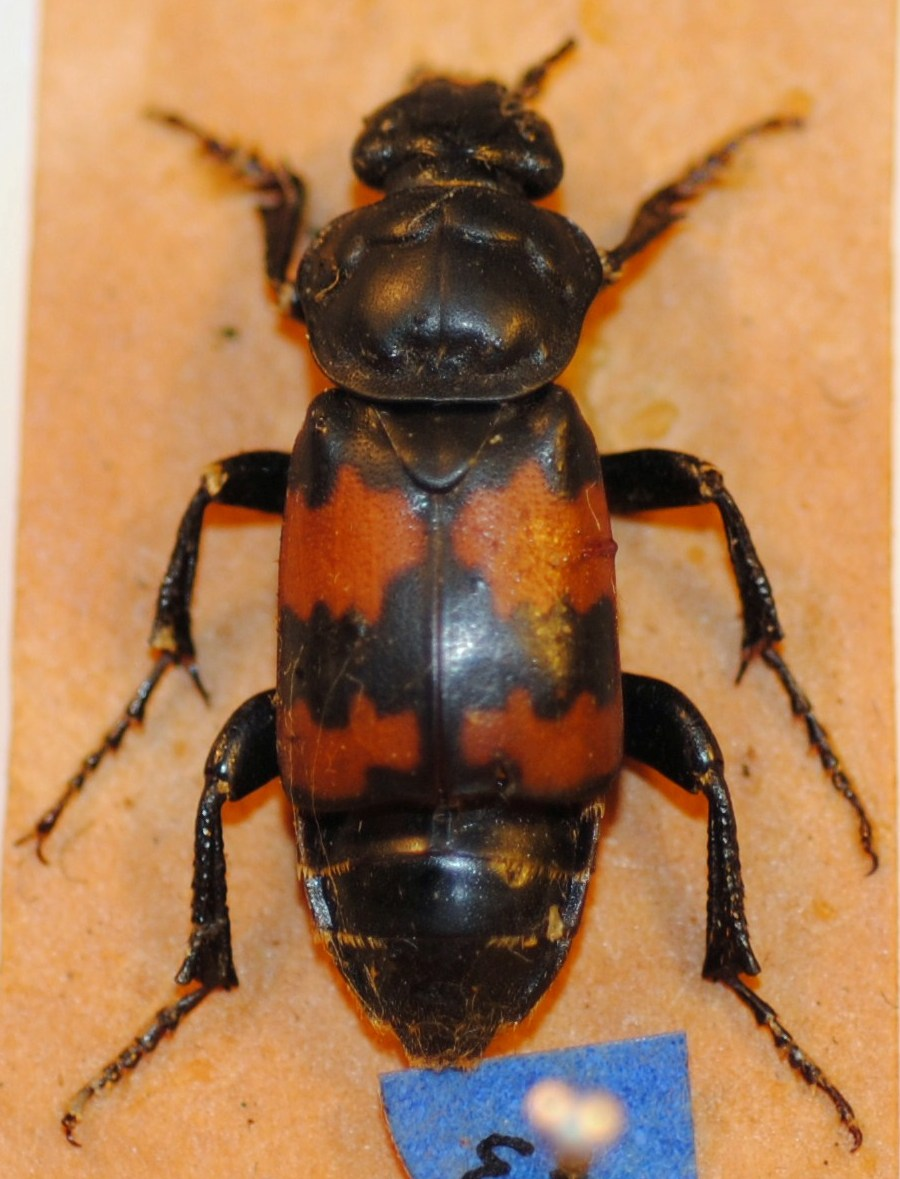

Scientific classification
- Kingdom: Animalia
- Phylum: Arthropoda
- Class: Insecta
- Order: Coleoptera
- Suborder: Polyphaga
- Infraorder: Staphyliniformia
- Family: Staphylinidae
- Genus: Nicrophorus
- Species: N. basalis

Binomial name
- Nicrophorus basalis Faldermann, 1835

= Nicrophorus basalis =

Species of beetle

Nicrophorus basalis is a burying beetle described by Franz Faldermann in 1835.
