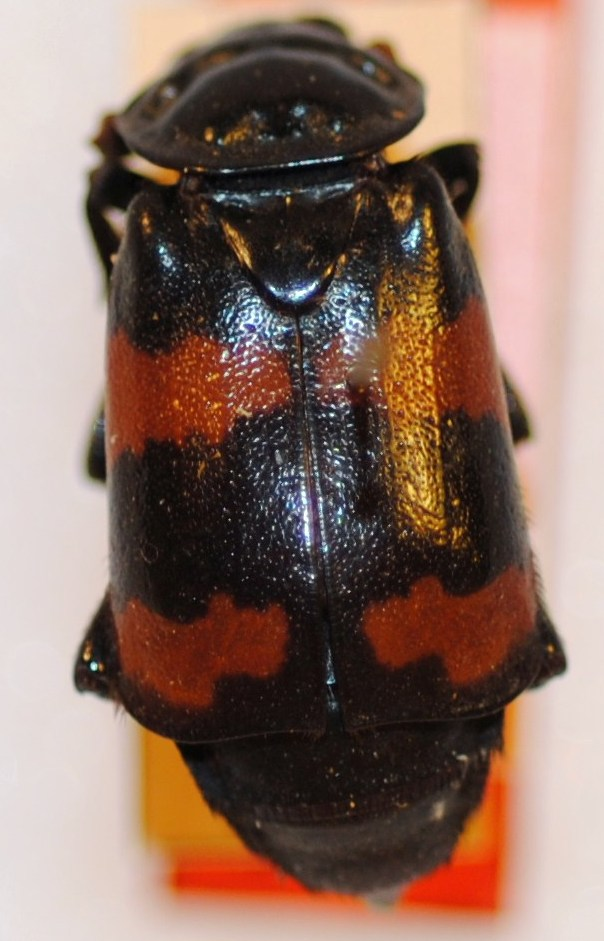

Scientific classification
- Kingdom: Animalia
- Phylum: Arthropoda
- Class: Insecta
- Order: Coleoptera
- Suborder: Polyphaga
- Infraorder: Staphyliniformia
- Family: Staphylinidae
- Genus: Nicrophorus
- Species: N. mongolicus

Binomial name
- Nicrophorus mongolicus Shchegoleva-Barovskaya, 1933

Synonyms
- N. (Necropter) mongolicus, Shchegoleva-Barovskaya, 1933

= Nicrophorus mongolicus =

Species of beetle

Nicrophorus mongolicus is a burying beetle described by Shchegoleva-Barovskaya in 1933.
