= Nicrophorus quadraticollis =

Scientific classification
- Kingdom: Animalia
- Phylum: Arthropoda
- Clade: Pancrustacea
- Class: Insecta
- Order: Coleoptera
- Suborder: Polyphaga
- Infraorder: Staphyliniformia
- Family: Staphylinidae
- Genus: Nicrophorus
- Species: N. quadraticollis

Binomial name
- Nicrophorus quadraticollis Portevin, 1903

Synonyms
- Necrophorus [sic] quadraticollis Portevin, 1903; Necrophorus [sic] inclusus Reitter, 1913; Nicrophorus quadricollis Hatch, 1928 (Preocc.)

Species of beetle

Nicrophorus quadraticollis is a burying beetle described by Portevin in 1903.
