= Nicrophorus japonicus =

Scientific classification
- Kingdom: Animalia
- Phylum: Arthropoda
- Class: Insecta
- Order: Coleoptera
- Suborder: Polyphaga
- Infraorder: Staphyliniformia
- Family: Staphylinidae
- Genus: Nicrophorus
- Species: N. japonicus

Binomial name
- Nicrophorus japonicus Harold, 1877

Synonyms
- Necrophorus [sic] japonicus Harold, 1877; Necrophorus [sic] japanus Fairmaire, 1878 (Missp.); Necrophorus [sic] japonicus f. degener Shchegoleva-Barovskaya, 1933

Species of beetle

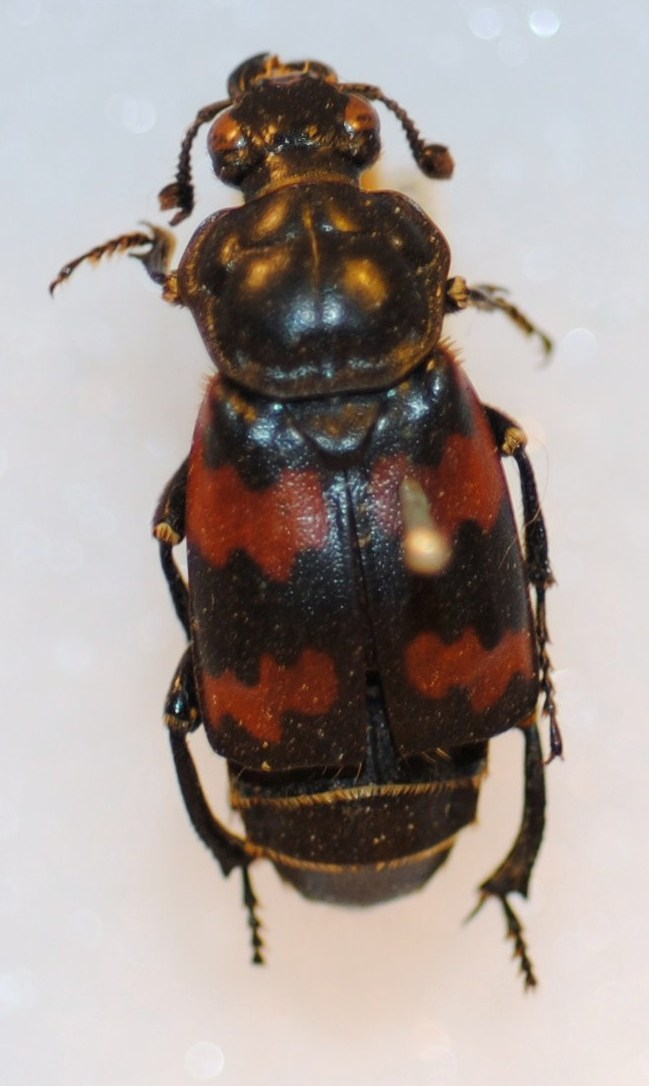
Nicrophorus japonicus. Harold, 1877.

Nicrophorus japonicus is a burying beetle described by Edgar von Harold in 1877. It has eastern Palearctic distribution in Japan, Korea, Mongolia, northern and central China, and the Ussuri region of Russia (Siberia).
