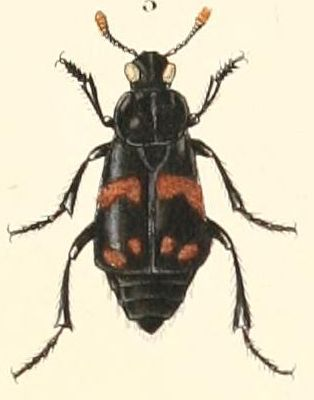

Scientific classification
- Kingdom: Animalia
- Phylum: Arthropoda
- Class: Insecta
- Order: Coleoptera
- Suborder: Polyphaga
- Infraorder: Staphyliniformia
- Family: Staphylinidae
- Genus: Nicrophorus
- Species: N. didymus

Binomial name
- Nicrophorus didymus Brullé, 1836

Synonyms
- Necrophorus [sic] didymus Brullé, 1836; Necrophorus [sic] didymus v. peruvianus Pic, 1917; Necrophorus [sic] flexuosus Portevin, 1924; Necrophorus [sic] flexuosus v. Portevini Pic, 1933

= Nicrophorus didymus =

Species of beetle

Nicrophorus didymus is a burying beetle described by Gaspard Auguste Brullé in 1836.
