= Nicrophorus pliozaenicus =

Scientific classification
- Kingdom: Animalia
- Phylum: Arthropoda
- Clade: Pancrustacea
- Class: Insecta
- Order: Coleoptera
- Suborder: Polyphaga
- Infraorder: Staphyliniformia
- Family: Staphylinidae
- Genus: Nicrophorus
- Species: †N. pliozaenicus

Binomial name
- †Nicrophorus pliozaenicus Gersdorf, 1969

Species of beetle

Nicrophorus pliozaenicus is an extinct species of burying beetle described by Erasmus Gersdorf in 1969.
