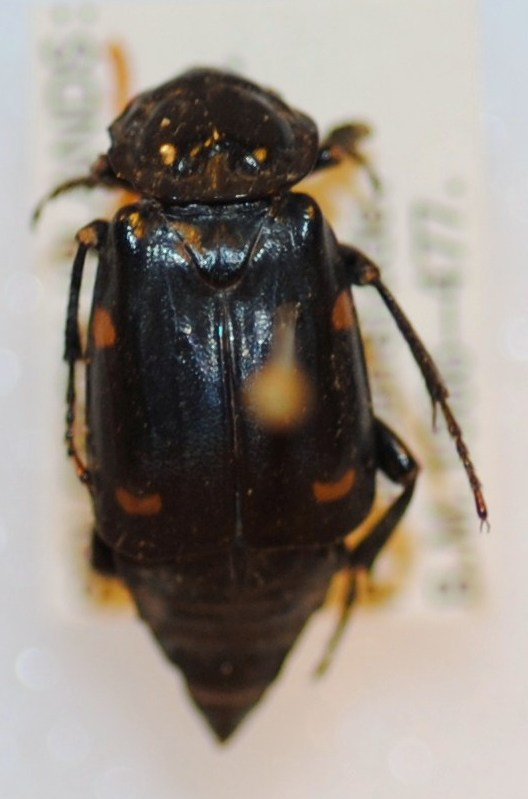

Scientific classification
- Kingdom: Animalia
- Phylum: Arthropoda
- Class: Insecta
- Order: Coleoptera
- Suborder: Polyphaga
- Infraorder: Staphyliniformia
- Family: Staphylinidae
- Genus: Nicrophorus
- Species: N. kieticus

Binomial name
- Nicrophorus kieticus Mroczkowski, 1959

= Nicrophorus kieticus =

Species of beetle

Nicrophorus kieticus is a burying beetle described by M. Mroczkowski in 1959. It is endemic to Bougainville Island, in the Papua New Guinean part of the Solomon Islands archipelago.
