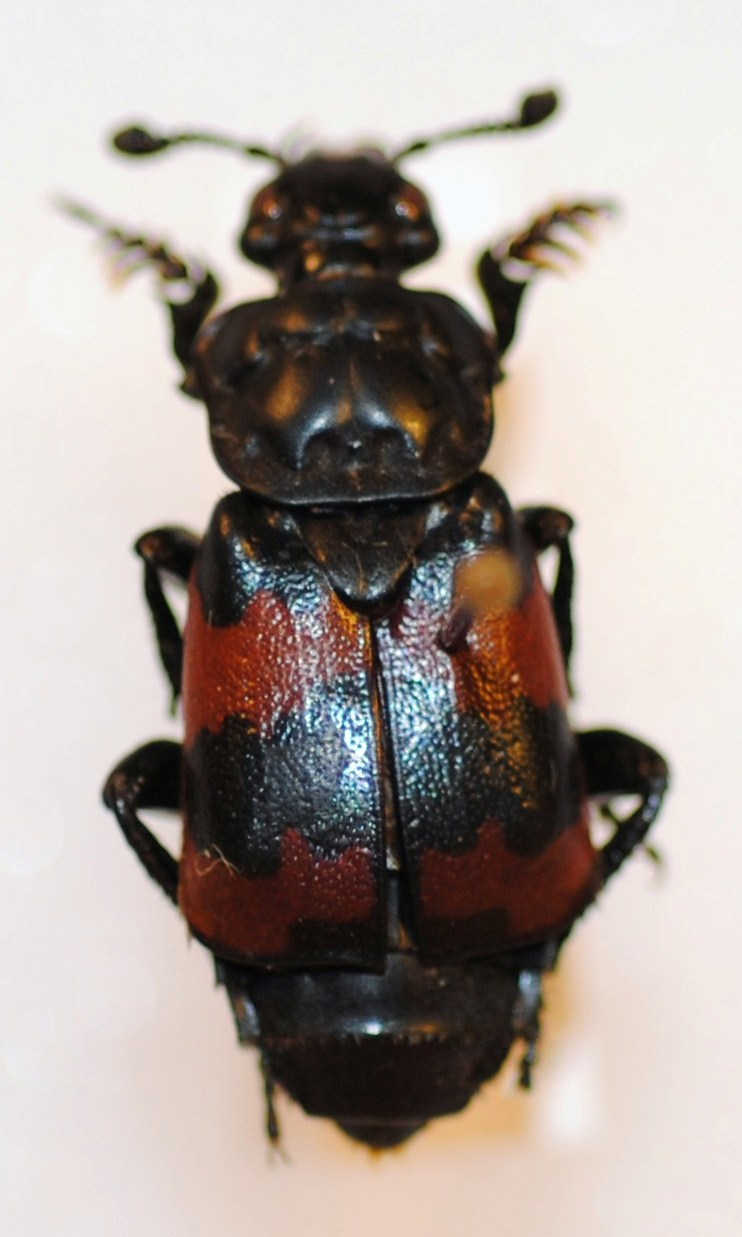

Scientific classification
- Kingdom: Animalia
- Phylum: Arthropoda
- Class: Insecta
- Order: Coleoptera
- Suborder: Polyphaga
- Infraorder: Staphyliniformia
- Family: Staphylinidae
- Genus: Nicrophorus
- Species: N. encaustus

Binomial name
- Nicrophorus encaustus Fairmaire, 1896

= Nicrophorus encaustus =

Species of beetle

Nicrophorus encaustus is a burying beetle described by Les Hydrethus Fairmaire in 1896.
