= Nicrophorus reichardti =

Scientific classification
- Kingdom: Animalia
- Phylum: Arthropoda
- Class: Insecta
- Order: Coleoptera
- Suborder: Polyphaga
- Infraorder: Staphyliniformia
- Family: Staphylinidae
- Genus: Nicrophorus
- Species: N. reichardti

Binomial name
- Nicrophorus reichardti Kieseritzky, 1930

Synonyms
- N. sepultor reichardti, Kieseritzky, 1930

Species of beetle

Nicrophorus reichardti is a burying beetle described by V. Kieseritzky in 1930.
