= Nicrophorus semenowi =

Scientific classification
- Kingdom: Animalia
- Phylum: Arthropoda
- Class: Insecta
- Order: Coleoptera
- Suborder: Polyphaga
- Infraorder: Staphyliniformia
- Family: Staphylinidae
- Genus: Nicrophorus
- Species: N. semenowi

Binomial name
- Nicrophorus semenowi Reitter, 1887

Synonyms
- Silpha (Necrophorus) semenowi Reitter, 1887; Necrophorus [sic] temporalis Shchegoleva-Barovskaya, 1933

Species of beetle

Nicrophorus semenowi is a burying beetle described by Edmund Reitter in 1887. It is endemic to China where it is known from the provinces of Gansu, Qinghai, and Tibet.
