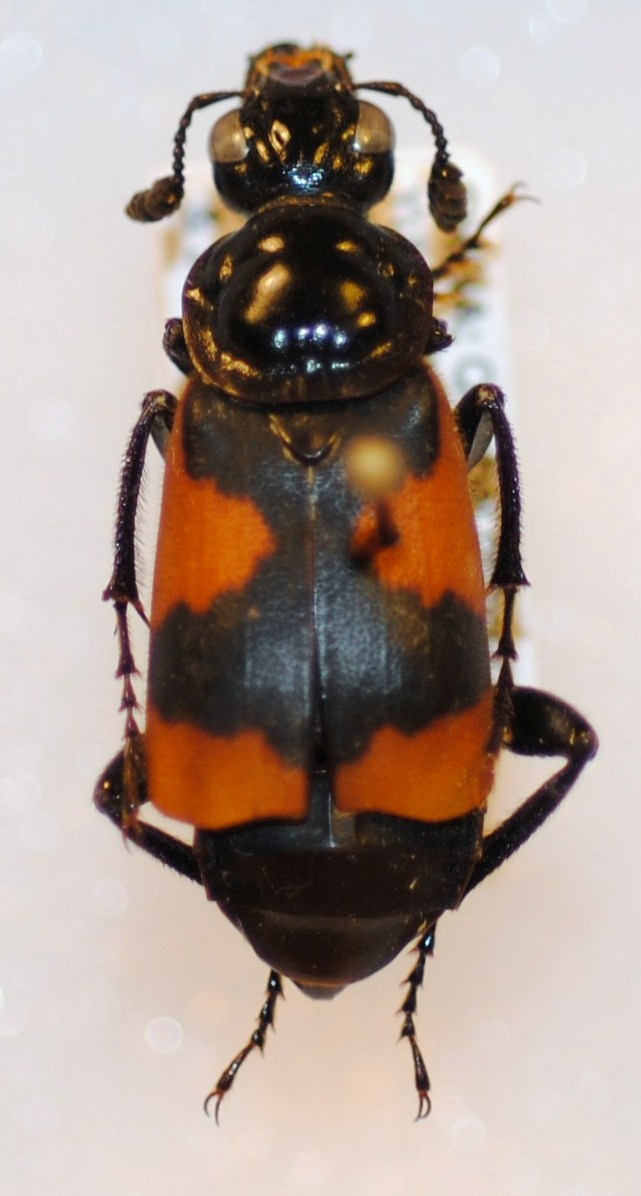

Scientific classification
- Kingdom: Animalia
- Phylum: Arthropoda
- Clade: Pancrustacea
- Class: Insecta
- Order: Coleoptera
- Suborder: Polyphaga
- Infraorder: Staphyliniformia
- Family: Staphylinidae
- Genus: Nicrophorus
- Species: N. przewalskii

Binomial name
- Nicrophorus przewalskii Semenov-Tian-Shanskij, 1894

Synonyms
- Necroxenus przewalskii, Semenov-Tian-Shanskij, 1926

= Nicrophorus przewalskii =

Species of beetle

Nicrophorus przewalskii is a burying beetle described by Semenov-Tian-Shanskij in 1894.
