= Nicrophorus confusus =

Scientific classification
- Kingdom: Animalia
- Phylum: Arthropoda
- Class: Insecta
- Order: Coleoptera
- Suborder: Polyphaga
- Infraorder: Staphyliniformia
- Family: Staphylinidae
- Genus: Nicrophorus
- Species: N. confusus

Binomial name
- Nicrophorus confusus Portevin, 1924

Synonyms
- N. sepultor confusus Kozminykh, 1993

Species of beetle

Nicrophorus confusus is a burying beetle described by Gaston Portevin in 1924 and determined, with reservation, to be a junior synonym of Nicrophorus sepultor by Sikes et al. (2008).
