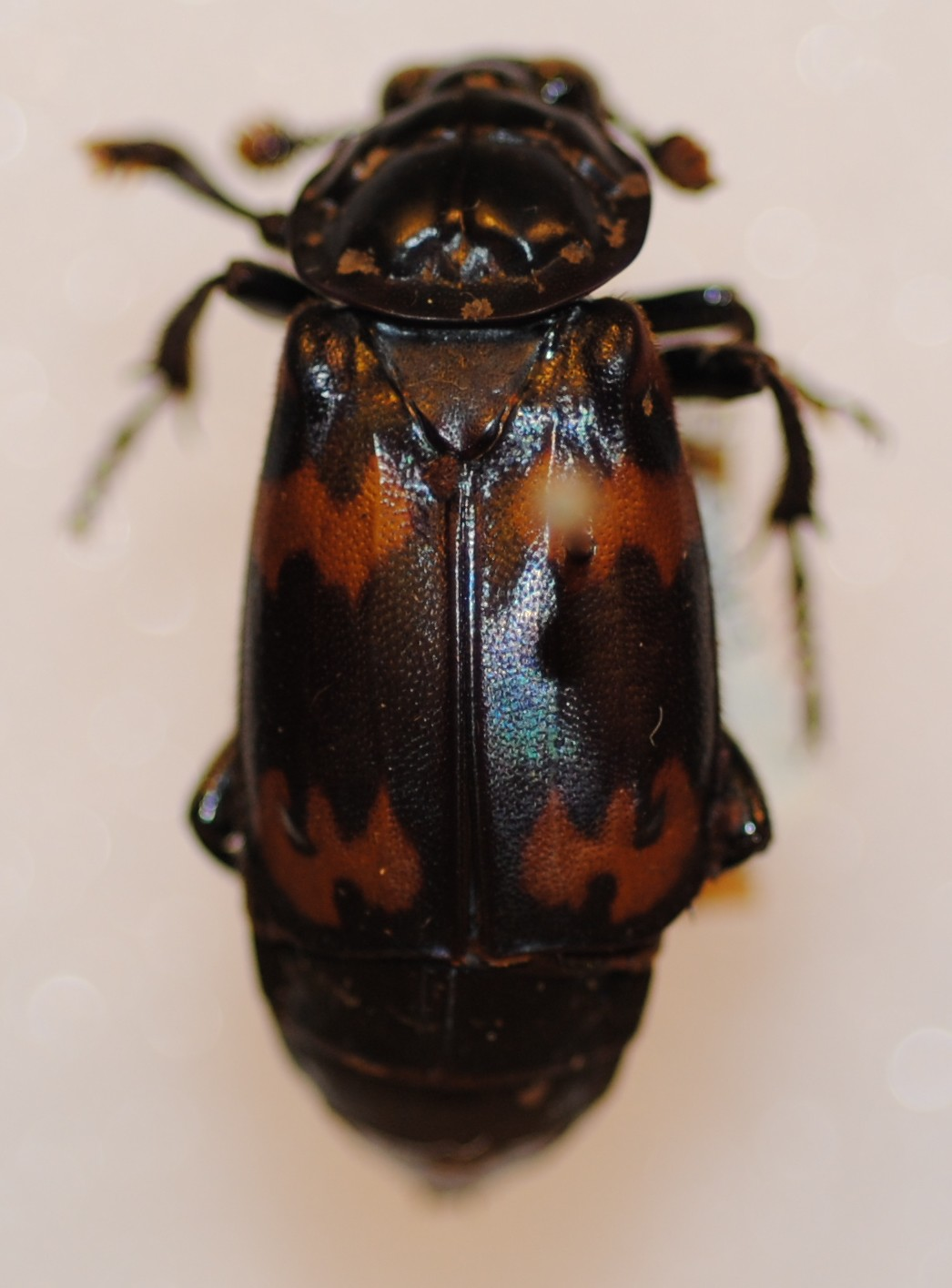

Scientific classification
- Kingdom: Animalia
- Phylum: Arthropoda
- Class: Insecta
- Order: Coleoptera
- Suborder: Polyphaga
- Infraorder: Staphyliniformia
- Family: Staphylinidae
- Genus: Nicrophorus
- Species: N. podagricus

Binomial name
- Nicrophorus podagricus Portevin, 1920

Synonyms
- Necrophorus [sic] podagricus Portevin, 1920; Necrophorus [sic] podagricus v. nigrifrons Portevin 1922

= Nicrophorus podagricus =

Species of beetle

Nicrophorus podagricus is a burying beetle described by Portevin in 1920.
