= Nicrophorus insularis =

Scientific classification
- Kingdom: Animalia
- Phylum: Arthropoda
- Class: Insecta
- Order: Coleoptera
- Suborder: Polyphaga
- Infraorder: Staphyliniformia
- Family: Staphylinidae
- Genus: Nicrophorus
- Species: N. insularis

Binomial name
- Nicrophorus insularis Grouvelle, 1893

Synonyms
- Necrophorus [sic] insularis Grouvelle, 1893; Necrophorus [sic] insularis v. humeralis Pic, 1917

Species of beetle

Nicrophorus insularis is a burying beetle described by A.H. Grouvelle in 1893.
