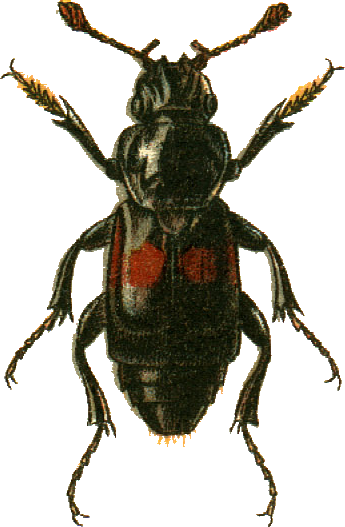

Scientific classification
- Kingdom: Animalia
- Phylum: Arthropoda
- Class: Insecta
- Order: Coleoptera
- Suborder: Polyphaga
- Infraorder: Staphyliniformia
- Family: Staphylinidae
- Genus: Nicrophorus
- Species: N. lunatus

Binomial name
- Nicrophorus lunatus Fischer von Waldheim, 1842

Synonyms
- Necrophorus [sic] lunatus Fischer von Waldheim, 1842; Silpha (Necrophorus) stenophthalma Jakovlev, 1887

= Nicrophorus lunatus =

Species of beetle

Nicrophorus lunatus is a burying beetle described by Gotthelf Fischer von Waldheim in 1842.
