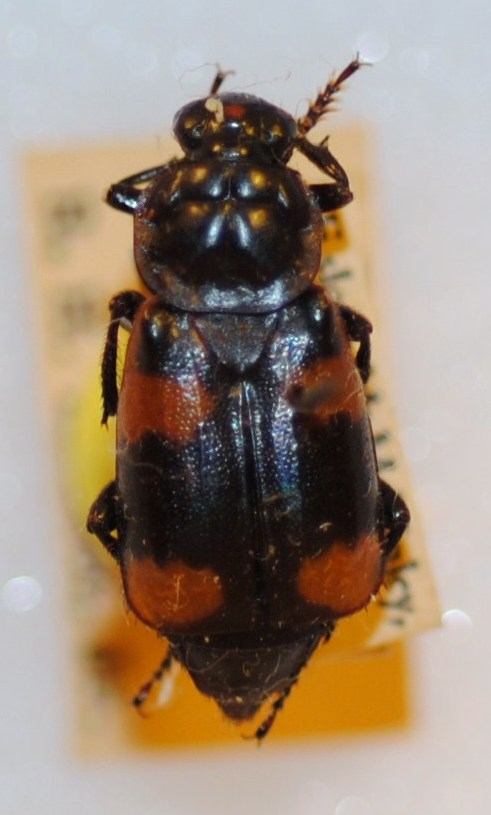

Scientific classification
- Kingdom: Animalia
- Phylum: Arthropoda
- Class: Insecta
- Order: Coleoptera
- Suborder: Polyphaga
- Infraorder: Staphyliniformia
- Family: Staphylinidae
- Genus: Nicrophorus
- Species: N. apo

Binomial name
- Nicrophorus apo Arnett, 1950

= Nicrophorus apo =

Species of beetle

Nicrophorus apo is a species of burying beetle found in Mindanao in the Philippines. The species was first described scientifically by Ross H. Arnett, Jr. in 1950, and is named after Mount Apo.
