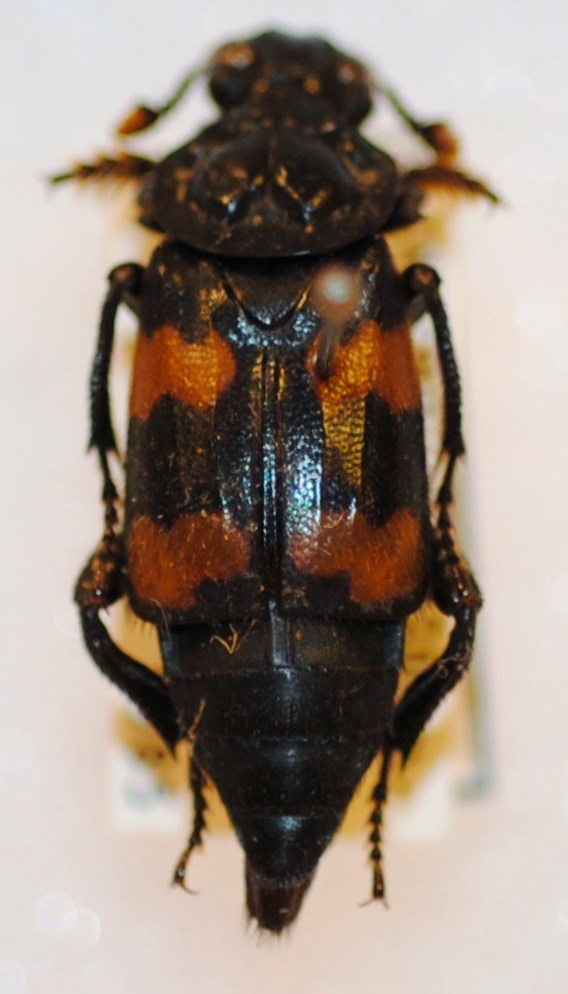
- Preserved specimen of Nicrophorus distinctus

Scientific classification
- Kingdom: Animalia
- Phylum: Arthropoda
- Class: Insecta
- Order: Coleoptera
- Suborder: Polyphaga
- Infraorder: Staphyliniformia
- Family: Staphylinidae
- Genus: Nicrophorus
- Species: N. distinctus

Binomial name
- Nicrophorus distinctus Grouvelle, 1885

Synonyms
- N. (Nesonecropter) d. Semenov-Tian-Shanskij, 1933

= Nicrophorus distinctus =

Species of beetle

Nicrophorus distinctus is a burying beetle described by A.H. Grouvelle in 1885.
