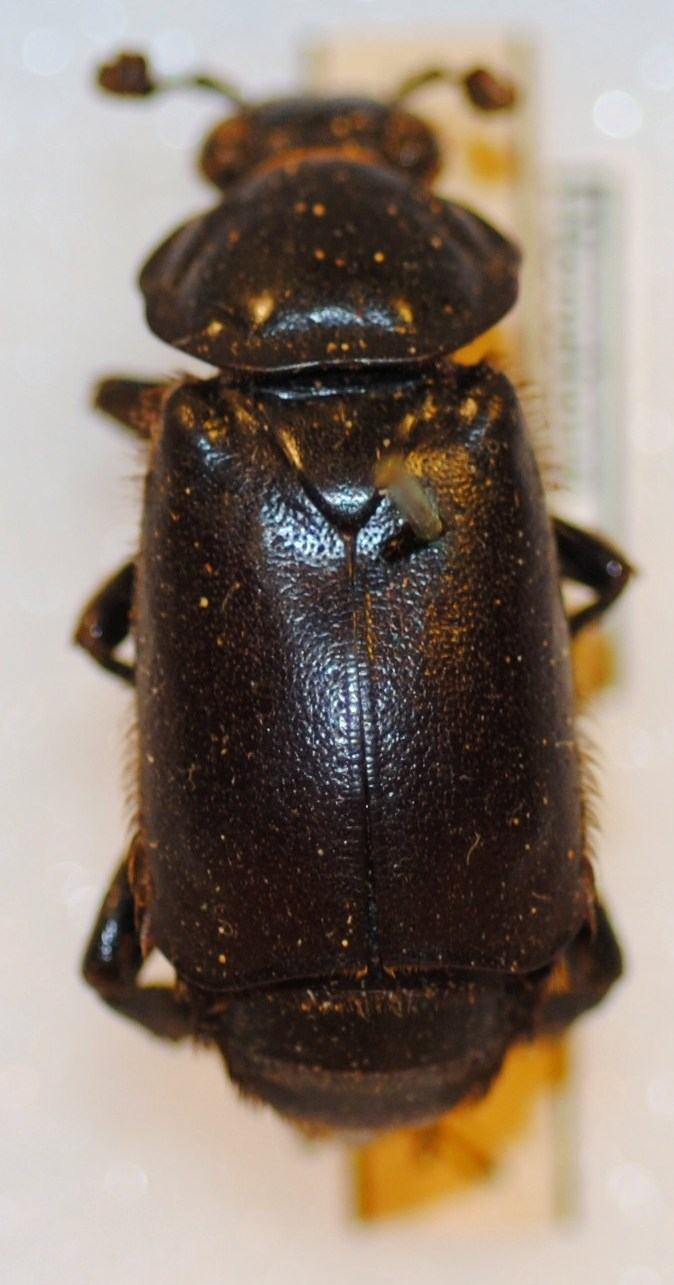

Scientific classification
- Kingdom: Animalia
- Phylum: Arthropoda
- Class: Insecta
- Order: Coleoptera
- Suborder: Polyphaga
- Infraorder: Staphyliniformia
- Family: Staphylinidae
- Genus: Nicrophorus
- Species: N. morio

Binomial name
- Nicrophorus morio Gebler, 1817

Synonyms
- Necrophorus [sic] Morio Gebler, 1817; Necrophorus [sic] rugulipennis Jakovlev, 1891; Necrophorus [sic] morio v. funebris Jakovlev, 1891

= Nicrophorus morio =

Species of beetle

Nicrophorus morio is a burying beetle described by Gebler in 1817.
