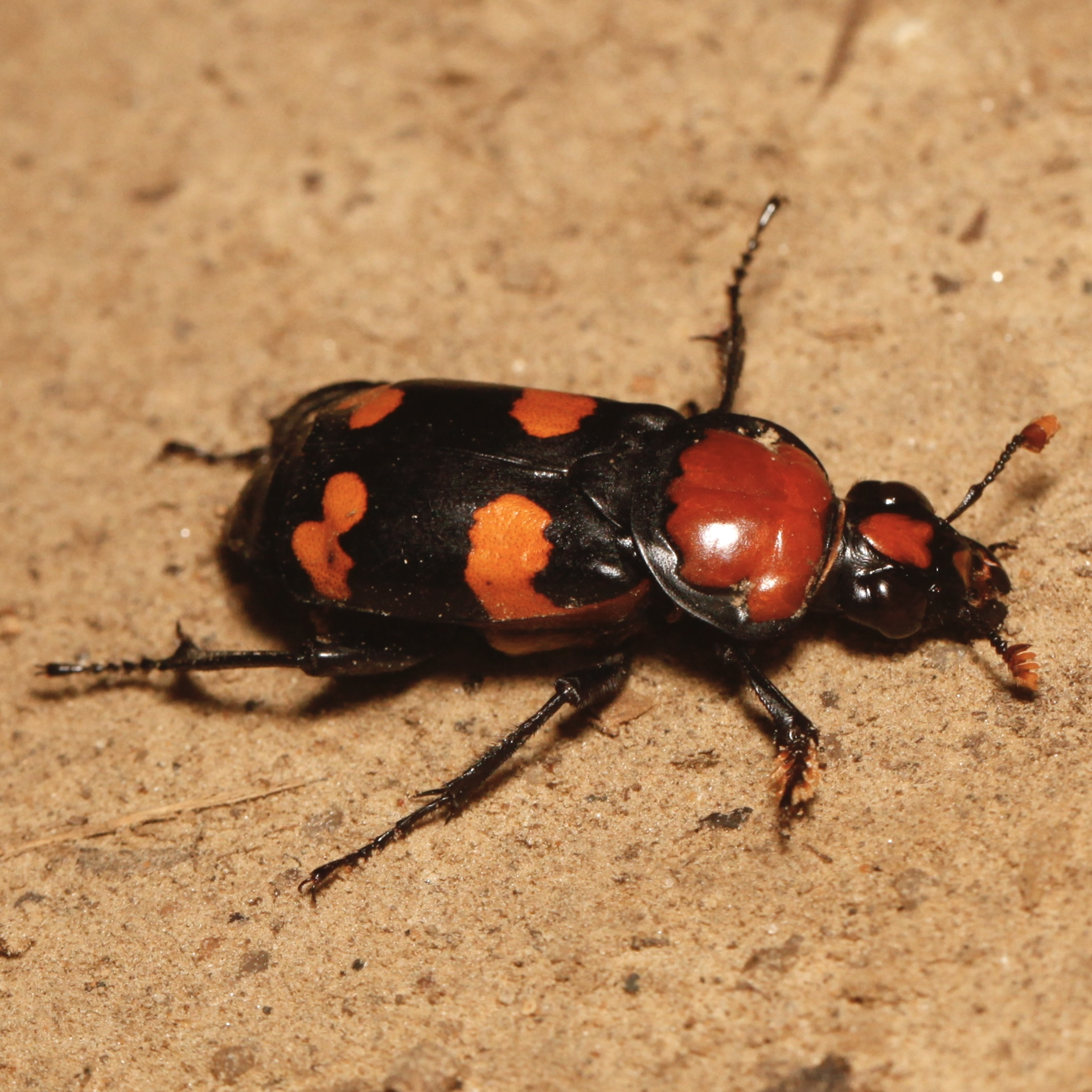
- American burying beetle (Nicrophorus americanus)
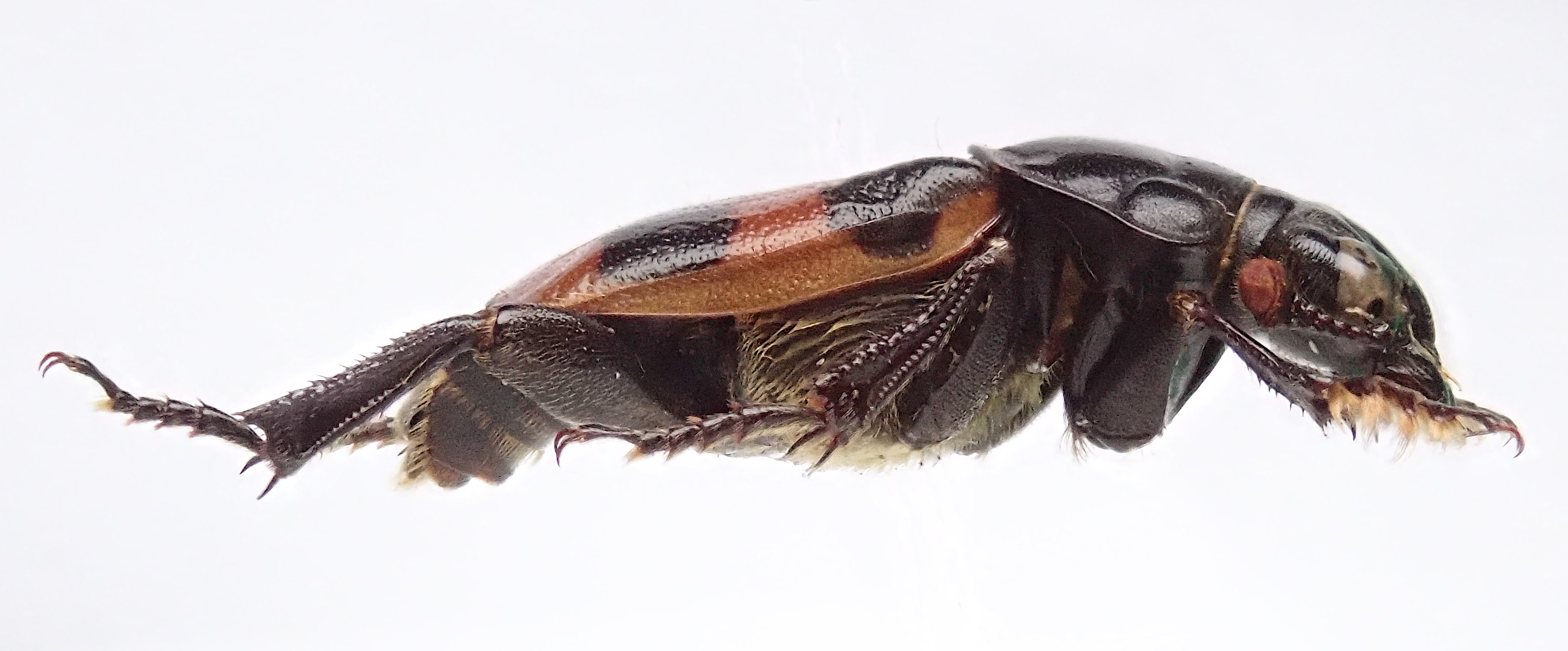
- Nicrophorus interruptus

Scientific classification
- Kingdom: Animalia
- Phylum: Arthropoda
- Clade: Pancrustacea
- Class: Insecta
- Order: Coleoptera
- Suborder: Polyphaga
- Infraorder: Staphyliniformia
- Family: Staphylinidae
- Subfamily: Silphinae
- Tribe: Nicrophorini
- Genus: Nicrophorus; Fabricius, 1775

Type species
- Silpha vespillo Linnaeus, 1758

Synonyms
- List: Acanthopsilus Poole, 1996; Canthopsilus Portevin, 1914; Cyrtoscelis Hope, 1840; Eunecrophorus Semenov-Tian-Shanskiy, 1933; Nechrocharis Poole, 1996; Necroborus Weigel, 1806; Necrocharis Portevin, 1923; Necrocleptes Semenov-Tian-Shanskiy, 1933; Necrophagas Leach, 1815; Necrophagus Poole, 1996; Necrophorindus Semenov-Tian-Shanskiy, 1933; Necrophoriscus Semenov-Tian-Shanskiy, 1933; Necrophorus Illiger, 1798; Necrophorus Thunberg, 1789; Necropter Semenov-Tian-Shanskiy, 1933; Necroxenus Semenov-Tian-Shanskiy, 1933; Neirophorus Berthold, 1827; Neonicrophorus Hatch, 1946; Nesonecrophorus Semenov-Tian-Shanskiy, 1933; Nesonecropter Semenov-Tian-Shanskiy, 1933; Nigrophorus Fabricius, 1787; Stictonecropter Semenov-Tian-Shanskiy, 1933

= Burying beetle =

Burying beetle Temporal range: Cenomanian–Recent

Genus of beetles

Burying beetles also known as sexton beetles, or Undertaker beetles, genus Nicrophorus, are the best-known members of the beetle subfamily Silphinae (carrion beetles). Most of these beetles are black with red markings on the elytra (forewings). Burying beetles are true to their name—they bury the carcasses of small vertebrates such as birds and rodents as a food source for their larvae; this makes them carnivorous. They are unusual among insects in that both the male and female parents take care of the brood.

The genus name is sometimes spelled Necrophorus in older texts: this was an unjustified emendation by Carl Peter Thunberg (1789) of Fabricius's original name, and is not valid under the ICZN.

The American burying beetle (Nicrophorus americanus) has been on the U.S. endangered species list since 1989. This species was native to 35 U.S. states but now is only known to exist in 9.

== Reproduction ==
Burying beetles have large club-like antennae equipped with chemoreceptors capable of detecting a dead animal from a long distance. After finding a carcass (most usually that of a small bird or a mouse), beetles fight amongst themselves (males fighting males, females fighting females) until the winning pair (usually the largest) remains. If a lone beetle finds a carcass, it may continue alone and await a partner. Single males attract mates by releasing a pheromone from the tip of their abdomens. Females can raise a brood alone, fertilizing her eggs using sperm stored from previous copulations. The carcass is usually buried by the beetle(s) to hide it from potential competitors, which are numerous.

An example of a species of Nicrophorus that displays this form of bi-parental care and burying activity is Nicrophorus nepalensis. Pairs of Nicrophorus nepalensis prepare carcasses and care for the developing larvae in a joint fashion. After burying a carcass, the beetles mate and lay eggs near/on the carcass. When the eggs hatch into larvae they begin feeding on the flesh of the carcass. The adults remain until the larvae begin to pupate.

Burying beetle life cycle

The prospective parents begin to dig a hole below the carcass. While doing so, and after removing all hair from the carcass, the beetles cover the animal with antibacterial and antifungal oral and anal secretions, slowing the decay of the carcass and preventing the smell of rotting flesh from attracting competition. The secretions also contain bacteria and fungi from the adults' gut microbiota. These microorganisms help shape the microbial community on the carcass and may contribute to both its preservation and digestion, and are transmitted to the offspring when the larvae feed on the meat. The carcass is formed into a ball and the fur or feathers stripped away and used to line and reinforce the crypt, also known as a nursery, where the carcass will remain until the flesh has been completely consumed. The burial process can take around 8 hours. Several pairs of beetles may cooperate to bury large carcasses and then raise their broods communally.

The female burying beetle lays eggs in the soil around the crypt. The larvae hatch after a few days and move into a pit in the carcass which the parents have created. Although the larvae are able to feed themselves, both parents also feed the larvae in response to begging triggered by a parental pheromone: they digest the flesh and regurgitate liquid food for the larvae to feed on, a form of progressive provisioning. This probably speeds up larval development. It is also thought the parent beetles can produce secretions from head glands that have anti-microbial activity, inhibiting the growth of bacteria and fungi on the vertebrate corpse.

The adult beetles continue to protect the larvae, which take several days to mature. Many competitors make this task difficult, e.g. bluebottles and ants or burying beetles of either another or the same species. Throughout the entirety of the larva's development, the parents fight off these competitors all the while maintaining an ideal nursery inside the carcass for their offspring. The final-stage larvae migrate into the soil and pupate, transforming from larvae to fully formed adult beetles.

Parental care (and particularly biparental care) is quite rare among insects that are not eusocial (e.g. ants and honey bees). Burying beetles are exceptional in exhibiting this trait, and thus fall under the category of subsocial insects.

== Infanticide ==
Burying beetles are known to commit infanticide at an early stage, which is also known as culling their young. This is done to ensure that the supply of food provided by the carcass is sufficient to nourish all the larvae sufficiently. If there are too many young, they will all be underfed and will develop less quickly, reducing their chances of surviving to adulthood. If there are too few young, the resulting adult beetles will be large but the parents could have produced more of them. The most successful beetle parents will achieve a good balance between the size of offspring and the number produced. This method of brood size regulation might be the result of the eggs being laid before the female has been able to gauge the size of the carcass and hence how many larvae it can provision.

== Conservation ==
As of 2020, the American burying beetle (N. americanus) was reclassified from the endangered category to threatened by the Fish and Wildlife Service. Burying beetles are important to the ecosystem and aid in nutrient recycling by burying dead animals. This allows for the nutrient-rich carcass to be recycled by the system.

== Species ==
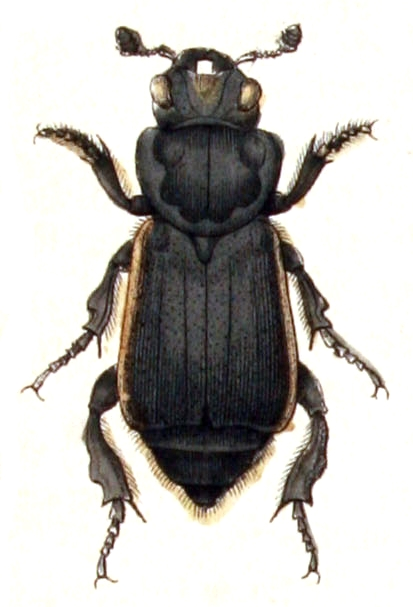
Nicrophorus germanicus

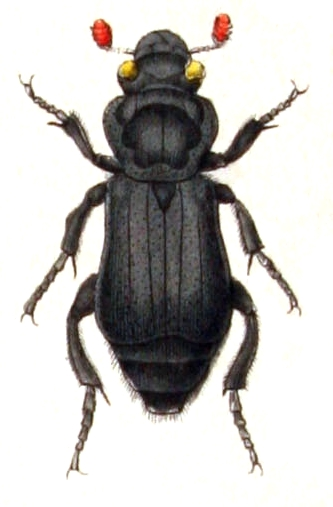
Nicrophorus humator

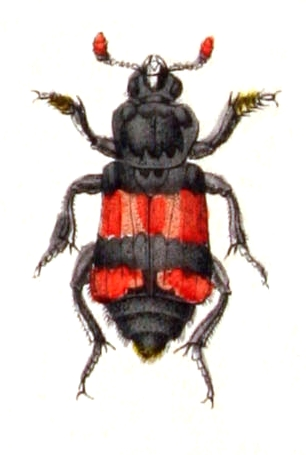
Nicrophorus investigator

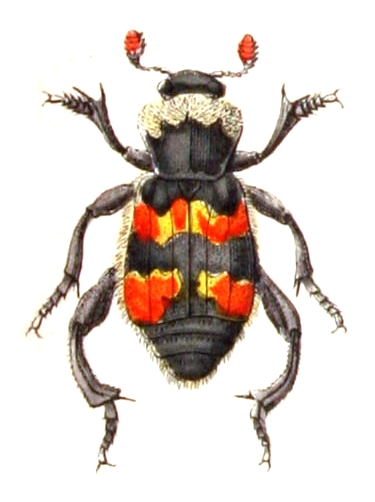
Nicrophorus vespillo

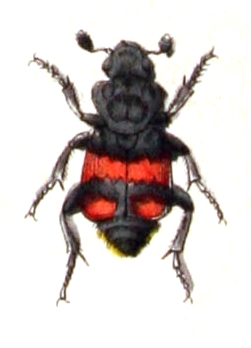
Nicrophorus vespilloides

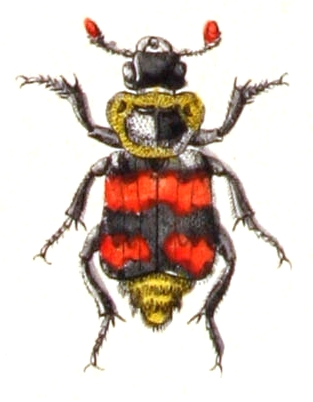
Nicrophorus vestigator

As of 2025 there are over 70 valid, extant species in the genus Nicrophorus although a few undescribed species and synonyms remain to be worked up.

- Nicrophorus americanus A.G.Olivier, 1790 (American Burying Beetle)
- Nicrophorus antennatus (Reitter, 1884)
- Nicrophorus apo Arnett, 1950
- Nicrophorus argutor (Jakovlev, 1891)
- Nicrophorus basalis (Faldermann, 1835)
- Nicrophorus carolinus (Linnaeus, 1771)
- Nicrophorus charon Sikes & Madge, 2006
- Nicrophorus chilensis (R.A.Philippi, 1871)
- Nicrophorus concolor (Kraatz, 1877)
- Nicrophorus confusus (Portevin, 1924)
- Nicrophorus dauricus (Motschulsky, 1860)
- Nicrophorus defodiens (Mannerheim, 1846)
- Nicrophorus didymus (Brullé, 1836)
- Nicrophorus distinctus (Grouvelle, 1885)
- Nicrophorus efferens Sikes & Mousseau, 2013
- Nicrophorus encaustus (Fairmaire, 1896)
- Nicrophorus germanicus (Linnaeus, 1758)
- Nicrophorus guttula (Motschulsky, 1845)
- Nicrophorus hebes (Kirby, 1837)
- Nicrophorus herscheli Sikes & Madge, 2006
- Nicrophorus heurni (Portevin, 1926)
- Nicrophorus hispaniola Sikes & Peck, 2000
- Nicrophorus humator (Gleditsch, 1767)
- Nicrophorus hybridus (Hatch & Angell, 1925)
- Nicrophorus insignis Sikes & Madge, 2006
- Nicrophorus insularis (Grouvelle, 1893)
- Nicrophorus interruptus (Stephens, 1830)
- Nicrophorus investigator (Zetterstedt, 1824)
- Nicrophorus japonicus (Harold, 1877)
- Nicrophorus kieticus Mroczkowski, 1959
- Nicrophorus lunatus (Fischer de Waldheim, 1842)
- Nicrophorus maculifrons (Kraatz, 1877)
- Nicrophorus marginatus (Fabricius, 1801)
- Nicrophorus melissae Sikes & Madge, 2006
- Nicrophorus mexicanus (A.Matthews, 1887)
- Nicrophorus mongolicus (Shchegoleva-Barovskaya, 1933)
- Nicrophorus montivagus (Lewis, 1887)
- Nicrophorus morio (Gebler, 1817)
- Nicrophorus nepalensis (Hope, 1831)
- Nicrophorus nigricornis (Faldermann, 1835)
- Nicrophorus nigrita (Mannerheim, 1843)
- Nicrophorus oberthuri (Portevin, 1924)
- Nicrophorus obscurus (Kirby, 1837)
- Nicrophorus olidus (A.Matthews, 1887)
- Nicrophorus orbicollis (Say, 1825)
- Nicrophorus podagricus (Portevin, 1920)
- Nicrophorus przewalskii (A.P.Semenov, 1894)
- Nicrophorus pustulatus (Herschel, 1807)
- Nicrophorus quadraticollis (Portevin, 1903)
- Nicrophorus quadricollis Gistel, 1848
- Nicrophorus quadrimaculatus (A.Matthews, 1887)
- Nicrophorus quadripunctatus (Kraatz, 1877)
- Nicrophorus reichardti (Kieseritzky, 1930)
- Nicrophorus reticulatus Sikes & Madge, 2006
- Nicrophorus satanas (Reitter, 1893)
- Nicrophorus sausai Růžička, Háva & J.Schneider, 2000
- Nicrophorus sayi (Laporte de Castelnau, 1840)
- Nicrophorus schawalleri Sikes & Madge, 2006
- Nicrophorus scrutator (É.Blanchard, 1842)
- Nicrophorus semenowi (Reitter, 1887)
- Nicrophorus sepulchralis (Heer, 1841)
- Nicrophorus sepultor (T.Charpentier, 1825)
- Nicrophorus sinensis Ji & Yun, 2013
- Nicrophorus smefarka Háva, J.Schneider & Růžička, 1999
- Nicrophorus tenuipes (Lewis, 1887)
- Nicrophorus tomentosus (Weber, 1801)
- Nicrophorus trumboi Sikes & Madge, 2006
- Nicrophorus ussuriensis (Portevin, 1923)
- Nicrophorus validus (Portevin, 1920)
- Nicrophorus vespillo (Linnaeus, 1758)
- Nicrophorus vespilloides Herbst, 1783
- Nicrophorus vestigator (Herschel, 1807)

=== Fossils ===
- †Nicrophorus pliozaenicus (Gersdorf, 1969)

A fossil of N. humator dating around 10,500 years was reported in 1962 by Pearson. An extinct unnamed member of the genus is known from the Late Cretaceous Cenomanian aged Burmese amber of Myanmar, around 99 million years old.
