= Jiří Háva =

Czech cyclist (1944–1976)

Personal information
- Born: 18 December 1944 Třešť, Protectorate of Bohemia and Moravia
- Died: 25 November 1976 (aged 31)

Cycling career
- Sport: Cycling

Jiří Háva (18 December 1944 – 25 November 1976) was a Czech cyclist. He competed in the individual road race at the 1972 Summer Olympics.
