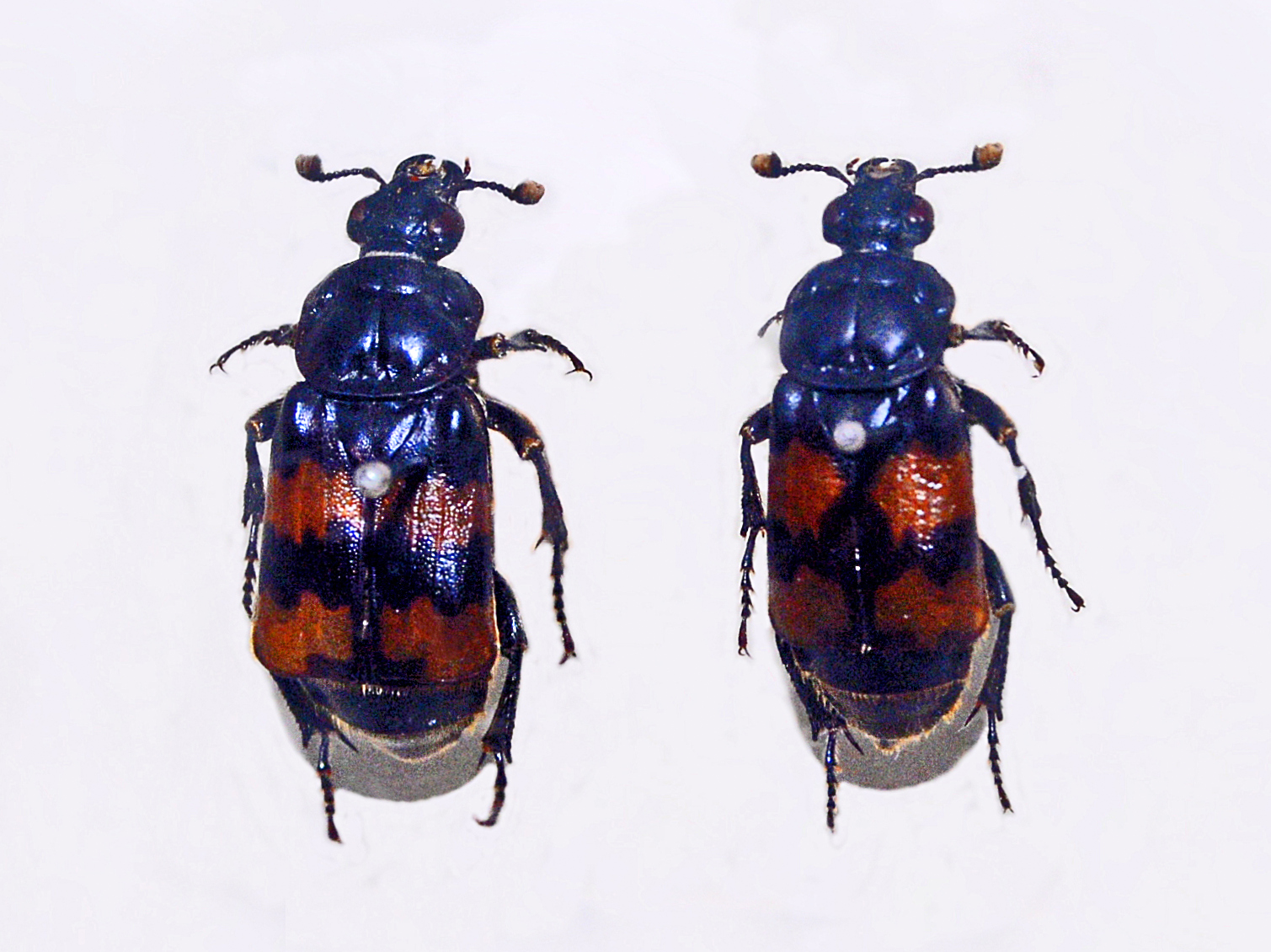
- Nicrophorus vestigator. Museum specimen

Scientific classification
- Kingdom: Animalia
- Phylum: Arthropoda
- Class: Insecta
- Order: Coleoptera
- Suborder: Polyphaga
- Infraorder: Staphyliniformia
- Family: Staphylinidae
- Genus: Nicrophorus
- Species: N. vestigator

Binomial name
- Nicrophorus vestigator Herschel, 1807

Synonyms
- Necrophorus [sic] Vestigator Herschel, 1807; Necrophorus [sic] sepultor Gyllenhal, 1827 (Preocc.); Necrophorus [sic] anglicus Samouelle, 1833 (Unav.); Necrophorus [sic] interruptus Brullé, 1832 (Preocc.); Necrophorus [sic] sepultor cadaverinus Mareuse, 1840 (Preocc.); Necrophorus [sic] olfactor Gistel, 1848; Necrophorus [sic] vestigator v. Rauterbergi Reitter, 1900; Necrophorus [sic] vestigator v. degener Carret, 1901; Necrophorus [sic] vestigator v. brullei Jacobson, 1910; Necrophorus [sic] vestigator v. bipunctatus Portevin, 1914 (Preocc.); Necrophorus [sic] vestigator v. obscuripennis Portevin, 1914; Necrophorus [sic] vestigator v. Viturati Pic, 1917; Necrophorus [sic] vestigator v. Carreti Pic, 1933

= Nicrophorus vestigator =

Species of beetle

Nicrophorus vestigator is a species of beetle belonging to the family Silphidae.

== Description ==
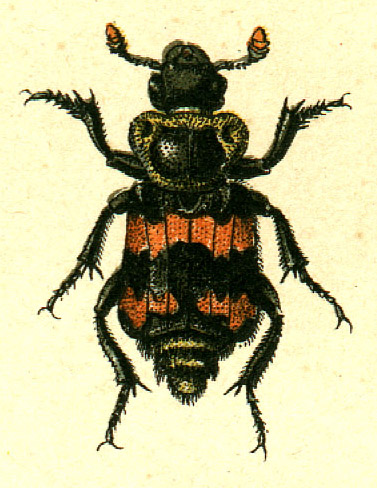
Illustration of Nicrophorus vestigator from G.G. Yakobson "Beetles of Russia"

Nicrophorus vestigator can reach a length of about 14–22 millimetres (0.55–0.87 in). The basic color of the body is black, with two wide transversal orange stripes on the elytra. These beetles have large club-like antennae equipped with black and yellow tips. The legs are strong. The last three abdominal segments protrude beyond the elytra.

Like other burying beetles they bury the carcasses of small vertebrates such as birds and mice as a food source for their larvae. Larval development takes place during the summer, and the fully formed individuals can be found mainly in May–June and in August.

== Distribution ==
This species is present in most of Europe, in the eastern Palearctic realm and in the Near East.

== Bibliography ==
- Sikes, Derek S., Ronald B. Madge, and Alfred F. Newton (2002) A catalog of the Nicrophorinae (Coleoptera: Silphidae) of the world, Zootaxa, no. 65
- Baranowski, R. 1982. Intressanta skalbaggsfynd 6. Ent. Tidskr.103: 130–136.
- Hansen, V. 1968. Biller XXV. Adselbiller, stumpbiller m.fl. Danmarks Fauna 77.
- Fabre, J.-H. 1925 Souvenirs Entomologiques Volume 6 Chapitre VII
