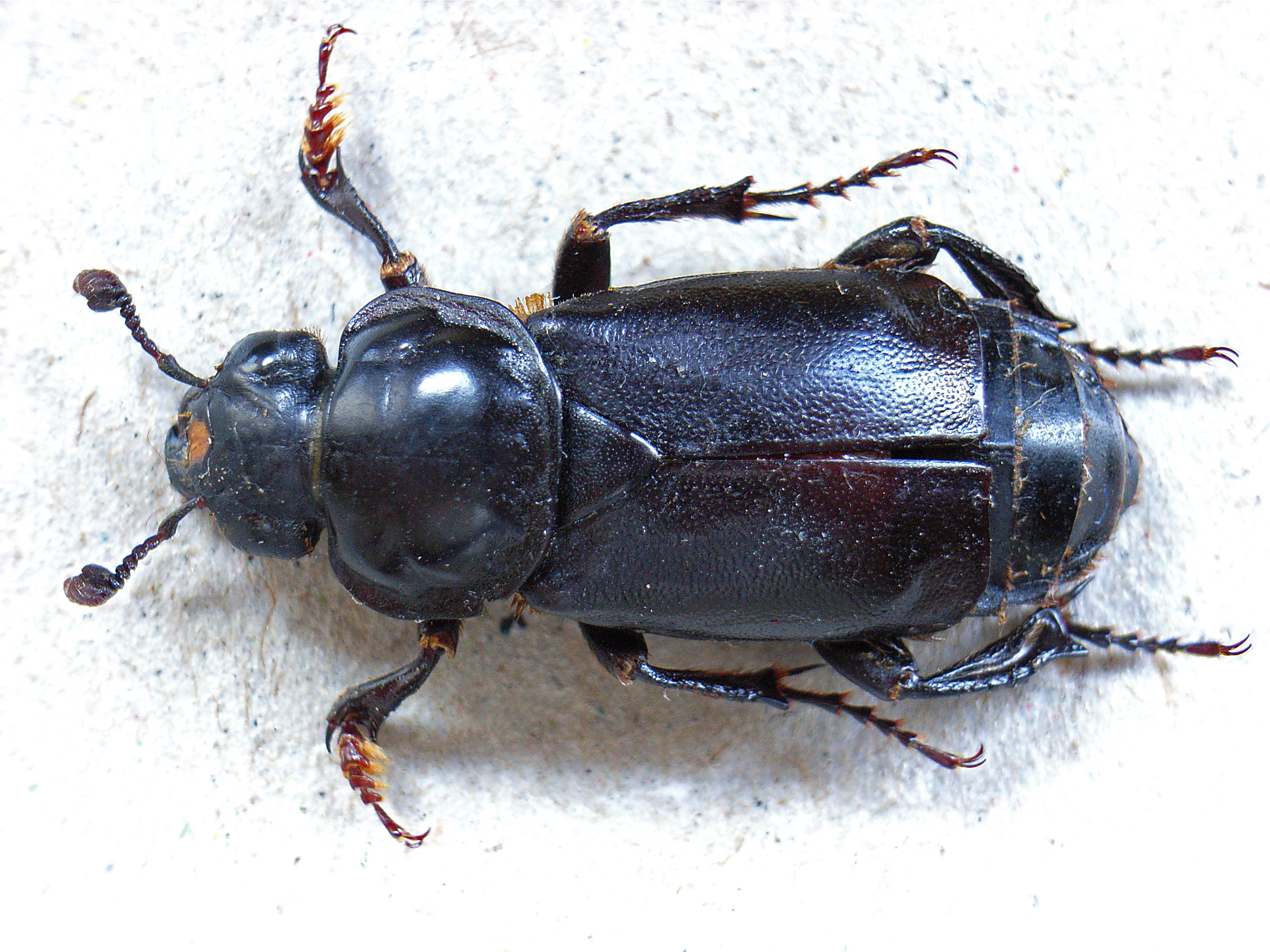

Scientific classification
- Kingdom: Animalia
- Phylum: Arthropoda
- Class: Insecta
- Order: Coleoptera
- Suborder: Polyphaga
- Infraorder: Staphyliniformia
- Family: Staphylinidae
- Genus: Nicrophorus
- Species: N. germanicus

Binomial name
- Nicrophorus germanicus Linnaeus, 1758

Synonyms
- List: Silpha germanica Linnaeus, 1758; Silpha speciosa J.D. Schulzens, 1775; Dermestes listerianus Fourcroy, 1785; Necrophorus [sic] bimaculatus Haworth, 1807; Necrophorus [sic] frontalis Fischer von Waldheim, 1844; Necrophorus [sic] cadaverinus Gistel, 1857 (Preocc.); Necrophorus [sic] proserpinae Gistel, 1857; Necrophorus [sic] ruthenus Motschulsky, 1859; Necrophorus [sic] germanicus v. bipunctatus Kraatz, 1880; Necrophorus [sic] germanicus v. apicalis Kraatz, 1880; Silpha germanica v. fascifera Reitter, 1884; Necrophorus [sic] grandior Angell, 1912; Necrophorus [sic] armeniacus Portevin, 1922; Necrophorus [sic] ornatus Hlisnikovsky, 1964

= Nicrophorus germanicus =

Species of beetle

Nicrophorus germanicus is a burying beetle described by Carl Linnaeus in his landmark 1758 10th edition of Systema Naturae. Males are larger than females and can reach a body length of 27 mm.

== See also ==
Nicrophorus quadripunctuatus
