= Jan Růžička =

Czech ice hockey player

- Růžička in 2026
- Born: February 23, 1997 (age 29) Mladá Boleslav, Czech Republic
- Height: 6 ft 1 in (185 cm)
- Weight: 192 lb (87 kg; 13 st 10 lb)
- Position: Goaltender
- Catches: Left
- Czech team Former teams: HC Škoda Plzeň; Des Moines Buccaneers; BK Mladá Boleslav; Mountfield HK
- Playing career: 2014–present

Jan Růžička (born February 23, 1997) is a Czech ice hockey goaltender. He is currently playing with HC Škoda Plzeň of the Czech Extraliga.

Růžička made his Czech Extraliga debut playing two games with BK Mladá Boleslav during the 2014–15 Czech Extraliga season.

== Career statistics ==
=== Regular season and playoffs ===
			Regular season										Playoffs
Season	Team	League	GP	W	L	T	OTL	MIN	GA	SO	GAA	SV%	GP	W	L	MIN	GA	SO	GAA	SV%
