= Josef Hlisnikovský =

Czech entomologist (1905–1972)

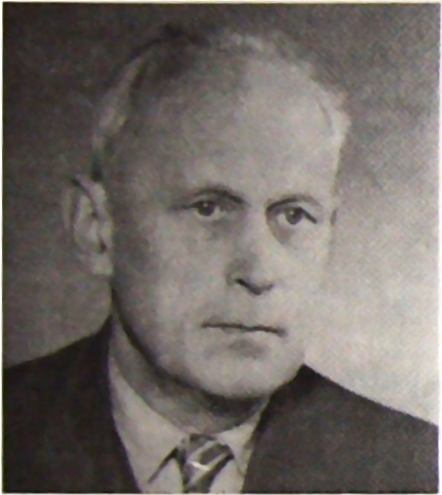

Josef Isidor Hlisnikovský (12 February 1905 – 24 May 1972) was a Czech entomologist and a professor of mining and engineering at the VSB – Technical University of Ostrava in Ostrava.

== Life and work ==
Hlisnikovský was born in Frýdek (now Frýdek-Místek), son of teacher Isidora and Francis née Hassanové. He studied at the German grammar school in Frýdek in 1917 and then went to the Czech grammar school in Ostrava in 1919. In 1925 he went to Prague and then to study mining at Příbram University. He then became assistant in the mining institute. He married Marie Karlová in Prague in 1933 and they had three children. He joined a mining company in Ostrava and was involved in work around Europe. In 1942 he was imprisoned and held at Auschwitz and Buchenwald concentration camps. After being liberated in 1945 he went back to Ostrava in 1946 he became the head of mining. In 1951 he became a part of the ministry of fuels and energy. In 1957 he taught at the mining school in Ostrava and in 1966 he became a full professor.

Hlisnikovský took an interest in entomology from an early age. He became a member of the Czechoslovak Entomological Society in 1930. He collected specimens in the Beskids mountain range and specialized on the beetles particularly of the family Leiodidae. He published nearly 60 papers in entomology. The beetle species Bledius hlisnikowskii was named after him by Jan Roubal in 1939. His entomological collections were donated to the National Museum in Prague.
