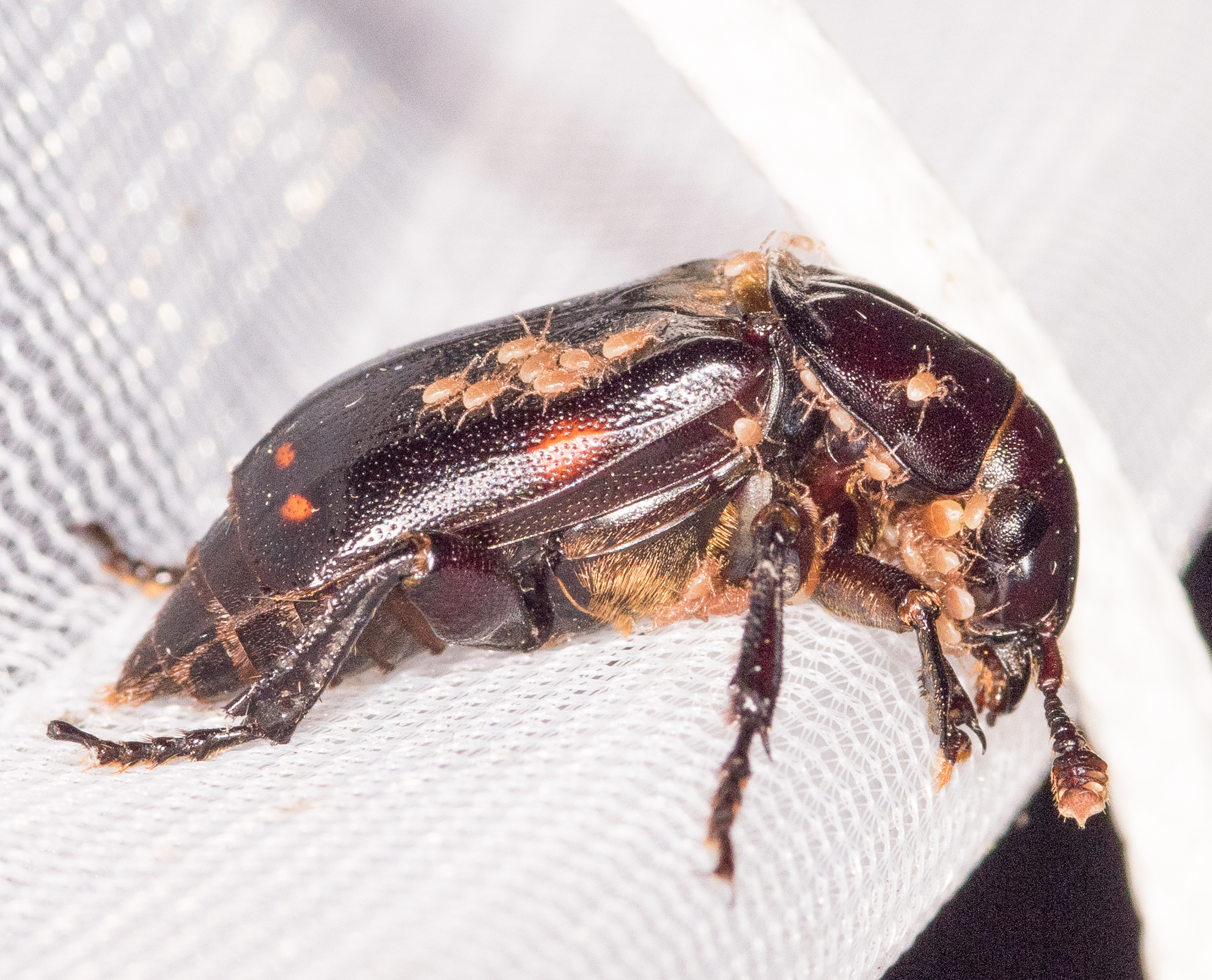
- Adult Nicrophorus pustulatus beetle, with phoretic mites

Scientific classification
- Kingdom: Animalia
- Phylum: Arthropoda
- Clade: Pancrustacea
- Class: Insecta
- Order: Coleoptera
- Suborder: Polyphaga
- Infraorder: Staphyliniformia
- Family: Staphylinidae
- Genus: Nicrophorus
- Species: N. pustulatus

Binomial name
- Nicrophorus pustulatus Illiger in Herschel (1808)

Synonyms
- Necrophorus [sic] pustulatus Illiger in Herschel, 1808; Necrophorus [sic] bicolon Newman, 1838; Necrophorus [sic] tardus Mannerheim, 1853; Necrophorus [sic] marginatus fasciatus Portevin, 1924; Necrophorus [sic] marginatus unicolor Portevin, 1924

= Nicrophorus pustulatus =

Species of beetle

Nicrophorus pustulatus, also known as the pustulated carrion beetle or blistered burying beetle, is a species of burying beetle that was described by Johann Karl Wilhelm Illiger in 1807. This species is native to North America. N. pustulatus exhibits unique habitat utilization and breeding behaviour relative to other members of the genus. This species may be the only described example of a true parasitoid targeting a vertebrate host.

== Taxonomy ==
=== Phylogeny ===
N. pustulatus is one of over 60 extant species in the genus Nicrophorus. This genus belongs to the subfamily Nicrophorinae (sexton beetles), which is one of two subfamilies in the family Silphidae (carrion beetles, large carrion beetles, or burying beetles). The family Silphidae belongs to the superfamily Staphylinoidea, infraorder Staphyliniformia, suborder Polyphaga, and order Coleoptera. The genus Nicrophorus is hypothesized to have evolved in the Cretaceous Period approximately 99-127 million years ago and then undergone most of its speciation in the period approximately 40-60 million years ago. This was the period when the small-bodied vertebrates that these beetles use for carrion were also radiating.

One recent molecular phylogeny of the genus Nicrophorus placed N. pustulatus as the sister species to N. hispaniola. The clade containing N. pustulatus and N. hispaniola is hypothesized to be sister to the clade containing N. tomentosus, N. hybridus, N. semenowi, N. nigrita, N. mexicanus, N. interruptus, N. investigator, N. encaustus, N. argutor, and N. sepultor. This placement was based on sequences from the mitochondrial COI (Cytochrome C Oxidase Subunit I) and COII (Cytochrome C Oxidase Subunit II) gene regions, and the nuclear D2 region of the 28S ribosomal RNA gene and protein coding CAD (carbamoylphosphate synthetase) gene.

General phylogeny and evolutionary divergence timeline diagrams can be accessed via Timetree.

=== Species description ===
The species is sometimes referred to as N. pustulatus Herschel, after Johann Dietrich Herschel. Hershel published an article describing two Nicrophorus beetles, to which a footnote was added by Johann Karl Wilhelm Illiger naming one of the species N. pustulatus. The article lists 1807 on the title page, but may have been published in 1808. The scientific name is now attributed in some places to Illiger, 1808. However, the valid name for this species registered with the Integrated Taxonomic Information System (ITIS) and the Catalogue Of Life (COL) is still Nicrophorus pustulatus Herschel, 1807. The original publication describing this species is available via the Biodiversity Heritage Library, with the relevant footnote on page 271. The presumed holotype specimen collected by Herschel was part of the Hellwig and Hoffmannsegg insect collection purchased by the Museum für Naturkunde Berlin in 1817, and is one of many historical type specimens housed in their Beetles and Strepsiptera collection.

== Physical description ==
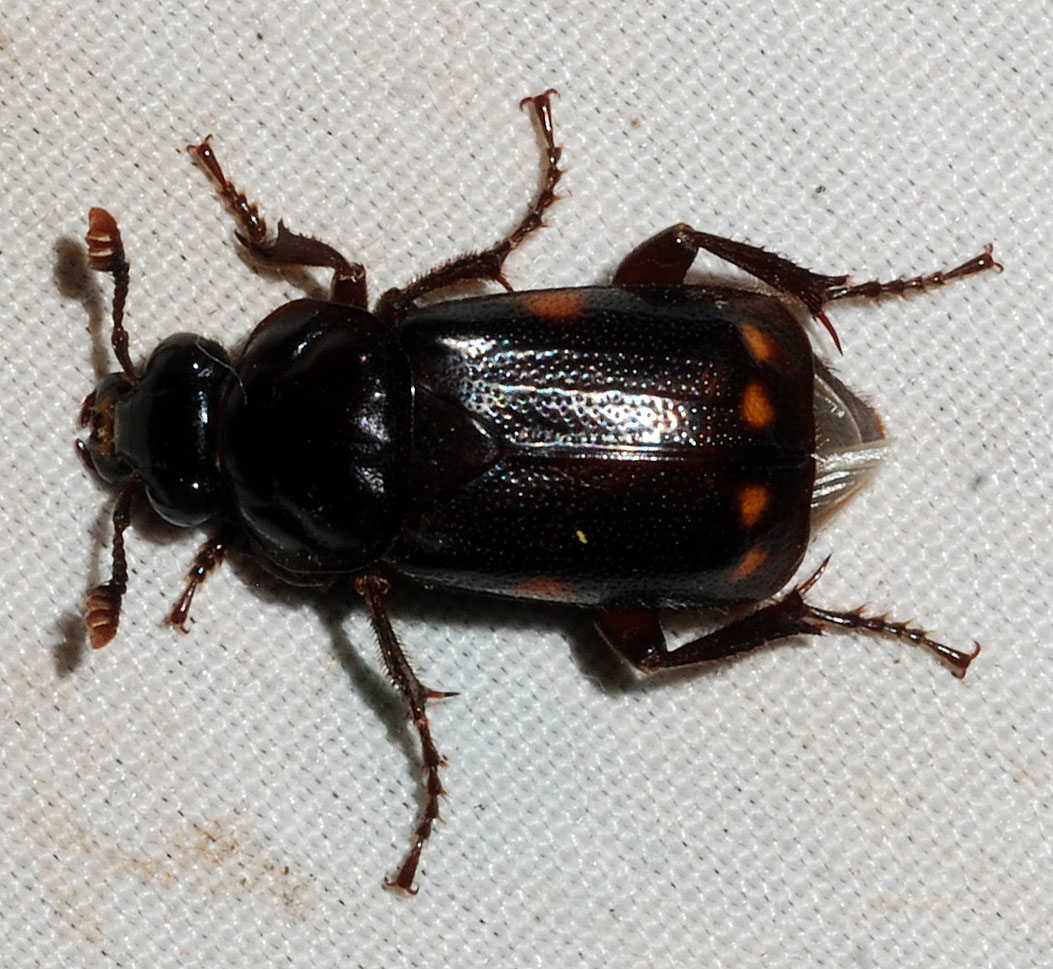
Adult Nicrophorus pustulatus beetle found in Maryland, United States

N. pustulatus is a medium-sized beetle, averaging 14.0-22.2 mm in length. Like other beetles in the family Silphidae, it has a semi-flattened body, noticeable tibial spurs, clubbed antennae, and a distinctive elytra shape that is broader at the posterior end. This species can be identified as part of the Nicrophorinae subfamily because of its distinctly clubbed and apparently 10-segmented antennae, as well as the shortened elytra that exposes 3-4 posterior abdominal segments.

The body of N. pustulatus is shiny and predominantly black in colour, with distinctive small, orange spots on the elytra. Each elytron has one spot midway down on the lateral edge, and two smaller spots on the posterior apex. These bright spots act as aposematic signals. The pronotum is oval shaped, relative to the more circular pronotum seen in other Nicrophorus species. Each antenna ends in a lamellate club that is divided into one basal, black segment and three terminal, orange segments. Unlike other members of the genus, N. pustulatus does not have long setae on the dorsal surface of the elytra. This species has sparse, yellow to brown pubescence (hairs) on the ventral surface of the metathorax, and is glabrous on the metepimeron on the side of the metathorax. N. pustulatus beetles also have a straight hind tibia with a lobe on the apex of the mesotibia, and an entirely black epipleuron with a long epipleural ridge on the elytron extending forwards towards the scutellum.

More photos of this species are available via the Maryland Biodiversity Project and iNaturalist.

== Geographic range ==
N. pustulatus is distributed in North America. It is present in southern Canada east of the Rocky Mountains, spanning Alberta, Saskatchewan, Manitoba, Ontario, Quebec, New Brunswick, Nova Scotia, and Prince Edward Island. N. pustulatus has been found as far north as near Marten Falls in the Kenora District of Ontario and Akimiski Island of Nunavut in Hudson Bay. One potential observation was submitted to iNaturalist from the Saint Piere and Miquelon island, off of Newfoundland, Canada, although the presence of an N. pustulatus population in this region needs to be confirmed. The range extends south in the eastern United States, from North Dakota south to Florida and the eastern region of Texas. N. pustulatus is not currently known to occur outside of North America.

Maps of the current distribution of N. pustulatus observations are available via iNaturalist and the Global Biodiversity Information Facility (GBIF). The Catalogue Of Life (COL) provides a list of Canadian provinces and American states where this species is present.

== Habitat ==
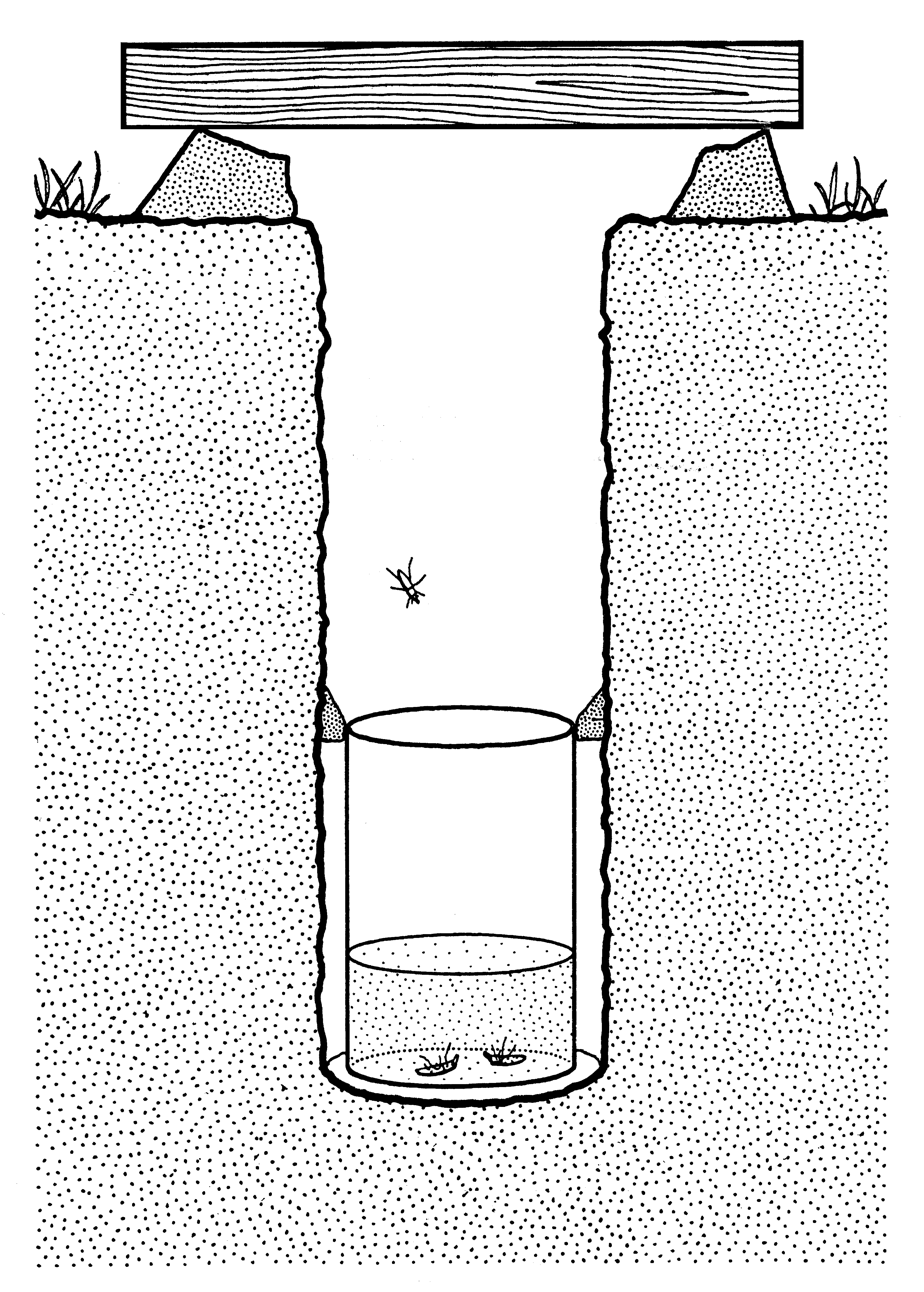
Example underground pitfall trap; pitfall traps targeting Nicrophorus beetles are baited with decomposing carrion

N. pustulatus beetles were formerly considered to be rare across their range, with unknown habitat requirements. Ground pitfall traps baited with carrion (which are typically successful for other Nicrophorus species) are ineffective at capturing this species, with N. pustulatus representing approximately 0-6% of Nicrophorus specimens caught in the traps. However, recent efforts with baited traps deployed above the ground in the canopy have been much more successful at capturing this species. N. pustulatus is now believed to be a common temperate forest canopy specialist, found in mature deciduous and mixed forests across its range. This is consistent with previous anecdotal observations of adult N. pustulatus beetles being found primarily in forests.

N. pustulatus has been detected using urban, suburban, and rural forests.

== Life history ==
=== Reproduction ===
The reproductive strategy of N. pustulatus remained unknown for many years, and still presents several knowledge gaps. Recent research and observations point to differences between N. pustulatus and other members of the genus.

N. pustulatus reproduces sexually, and has a variable breeding system that can include monogamy, polygyny, polyandry, or polygynandry. In Ontario, Canada, this species is reproductively active from late April until May or June.

Reproduction in Nicrophorus beetles centres around the use of small vertebrate carrion or other vertebrate-derived resources to raise broods of offspring. The typical reproduction process in this genus begins when adults emerge from overwintering in the spring and begin searching for suitable breeding resources via chemoreception (see Senses and communication: Chemoreception below). The beetles assess the suitability of carcasses they find by tasting and manipulating them, determining whether they are of appropriate size and freshness. Nicrophorus beetles target small carcasses (such as mice or birds) that are very fresh, and have not yet been used by other insects, such as Dipterans (flies). Males release pheromones to attract females. If the male has not located a carcass, the pair will mate and separate, allowing the female to use the sperm later on. If the male has found a suitable carcass, the pair may copulate repeatedly while preparing the carcass by removing hair or feathers, applying anti-microbial secretions, rounding it into a brood ball, and burying the ball underground by digging underneath it. The pair may encounter competition with conspecifics or heterospecifics during this time, along other potential mating opportunities. N. pustulatus beetles are oviparous, with the female depositing her clutch of eggs in the soil next to the carcass.

This reproductive system describes N. pustulatus for the most part, with some unique exceptions. For example, N. pustulatus has not been known to utilize carrion or bury breeding resources underground in the wild (see Use of breeding resources below).

Research on the related species N. vespilloides has indicated that mating pairs of beetles that are raising broods together can recognize each other using the pattern of hydrocarbons present in their cuticles.

The size of the N. pustulatus brood and larvae are dependant on the size of the carcass, population density, and the age, size, and condition of the female. N. pustulatus pairs have been known to be hyper-fecund compared to other members of the genus, raising broods of up to 187 offspring on larger carcasses in captivity.

==== Use of breeding resources ====
There is a remaining knowledge gap surrounding what set of breeding resources N. pustulatus uses in the wild. Unlike most Nicrophorus beetles that utilize and bury small carcasses underground, N. pustulatus appears to be capable of using a wider range of resources in unique ways. In the wild, N. pustulatus has only ever been observed successfully breeding on snake eggs (see Ecosystem roles and relationships: Parasitoidism below). The species has not been observed reproducing on small carcasses in the wild (either naturally occurring or experimentally deployed); however, this may be due to experimental carcasses being placed on the ground and not in the canopy. The forest canopy is rich in carrion resources that could potentially be used by this species, including Sciuridae (squirrel), Aves (bird), and Chiroptera (bat) sources. Recent studies baiting traps with raw chicken and fish in the canopy have successfully captured N. pustulatus adults. In laboratory settings, N. pustulatus buries small vertebrate carcasses (approximately mouse-sized), as is typical of the genus, but has also been found to utilize larger carcasses (approximately rat-sized). In experiments offering mouse carcasses, snake eggs, and turtle eggs, N. pustulatus pairs raised broods successfully on all three and even combined resources - utilizing carrion and snake eggs at the same time.

N. pustulatus beetles have also been found in association with bird nests. In one case, a Nicrophorus pustulatus beetle was observed burying live Tachycineta bicolor (tree swallow) nestlings under the substrate in a nest box at the Queen's University Biological Station (QUBS) outside Kingston, Ontario, Canada. The beetle may have initially been attracted by one dead nestling, and proceeded to bury the remaining live ones. In another case, three adults were found in a failed Aegolius acadicus (northern saw-whet owl) nest. As a canopy specialist, N. pustulatus may be utilizing bird nests as sources of food or sites for reproduction, and potentially even targeting fish-eating raptor nests as sources of fish carrion.

Burying carrion in the canopy may not be possible, unless the beetles utilize bird nests. Further, N. pustulatus beetles do not appear to bury snake eggs when they utilize them, while they do bury small carcasses in laboratory settings. Thus, the burying behaviour that this genus and subfamily are known for may not be characteristic of N. pustulatus.

=== Development ===
N. pustulatus beetles are holometabolous and have six life stages, including the egg, first larval instar, second larval instar, third larval instar, pupal, and adult stages. The female oviposits approximately 36–72 hours after locating a suitable food source, depositing her eggs close to the carrion or reptile eggs. These eggs typically hatch within 3 days. The first instar larvae crawl into the carrion or other food source after hatching and feed for approximately 12 hours, at which point they molt into the second instar through the process of ecdysis. The second larval stage lasts for approximately 24 hours, and the third for 5–15 days. The third instar larvae disperse from the brooding area, wander for several days, and then and pupate for 3–4 weeks, eventually emerging as new adults after completing their metamorphosis. These adults will become sexually mature within 1 month. It is thought that N. pustulatus overwinters in the adult stage, before resuming activity in the spring to reproducing.

The phenology of development varies by location. In Ontario, Canada, the teneral adults emerge in late July or early August.

=== Parental care ===
N. pustulatus exhibits highly developed, yet partially facultative, bi-parental or uni-parental care. The parents provide obligate pre-hatching parental care by supplying food to the young; this involves procuring a suitable resource, preparing it (such as making a brood ball or opening up egg shells), pre-digesting material using oral secretions, and protecting the resource from both conspecifics and heterospecifics. Once the eggs hatch, N. pustulatus beetles provide post-hatching parental care by regurgitating food for the first instar larvae directly from their mandibles in response to larval begging, and then by preparing food for the later instars using their oral secretions. N. pustulatus parents manage the brood size to ensure the success of remaining larvae, either by controlling the number of eggs or culling the larvae according to resource availability. This type of intentional cannibalism of offspring to manage for the carrying capacity on limited resources is relatively uncommon among insects. Both the male and female will physically defend the young against intruders and predators, which may involve considerable risk to the parent.

Post-hatching parental care is facultative in N. pustulatus because the brood can survive and develop successfully with uni-parental care, or even in the absence of post-hatching parental care. Uni-parental care can be provided by either the male or female parent, and both sexes will increase their parental investment to compensate for the loss of a mate. However, the larvae of this species can successfully develop on their own after a food source has been provided and prepared by the parents. N. pustulatus larvae are known to be more independent than the larvae of related species, and the larvae subsequently invest less energy in begging. Because the parents and larvae must share the finite carrion or reptile eggs as a food source during the reproductive period, bi-parental care may even be costly under certain conditions. The contribution of the male to parental care is weighed against the amount of food he eats, and the female benefits energetically when the male deserts early.

=== Lifespan ===
The lifespan of N. pustulatus individuals in the wild has not yet been studied. Research on the related species N. orbicollis suggests that the beetles generally live for one year and reproduce only once, but may occasionally survive a second winter and reproductive season.

== Behaviour ==
N. pustulatus adults are nocturnal. The adults are frequently observed around lights at night.

=== Intraspecific competition ===
Nicrophorus species generally compete intensely with conspecifics for access to scarce breeding resources, as carcasses are often only utilized by one pair in the wild. Breeding adults may attempt to take over the carcass of another pair, involving physical fights and infanticide. The intruders typically kill and consume most of the previous pair's larvae, but some may be raised along with the new brood. Intruders may be pairs or single male or female beetles; successful single intruders typically mate with the remaining opposite-sex resident, producing their own brood. Intrusions and infanticide usually occur while the resident beetle's offspring are eggs or first instar larvae, and become less frequent when the larvae reach their second instar stage and the food source is more depleted. Body size influences the outcome of competitive interactions.

== Food habits ==
N. pustulatus adults and larvae are necrophagous. Adult N. pustulatus beetles may consume Diptera (fly) larvae, the larvae of competitors, and carrion at carcasses, as well as other food resources such as dung and decaying fungi. Carrion is consumed via extra oral digestion, by applying oral secretions containing proteinases and other enzymes and then consuming the resulting fluid. Adults visit larger, more decomposed carcasses to feed before the breeding period, in contrast to the smaller, fresher food sources used for breeding. N. pustulatus larvae specialize on the pre-digested carrion or other food provided by the parents.

== Ecosystem roles and relationships ==
=== Brood parasitism ===
N. pustulatus is known to be capable of facultative brood parasitism, targeting other Nicrophorus species. In laboratory experiments, N. pustulatus has been shown to parasitize broods of N. orbicollis, laying eggs amongst the N. orbicollis brood that are raised by the host parents. Nicrophorus beetles appear to be able to detect brood parasites in some cases, but often only cull a portion of the introduced larvae and raise the others. The outcome of competition between Nicrophorus beetles over scarce carrion resources is typically determined by body size, so brood parasitism may allow N. pustulatus to benefit from carrion even when excluded by larger species (see Interspecific competition below). This behaviour may also be adaptive because it allows N. pustulatus to benefit from the antimicrobial secretions of other Nicrophorus species (see Microbiome below).

=== Parasitoidism ===
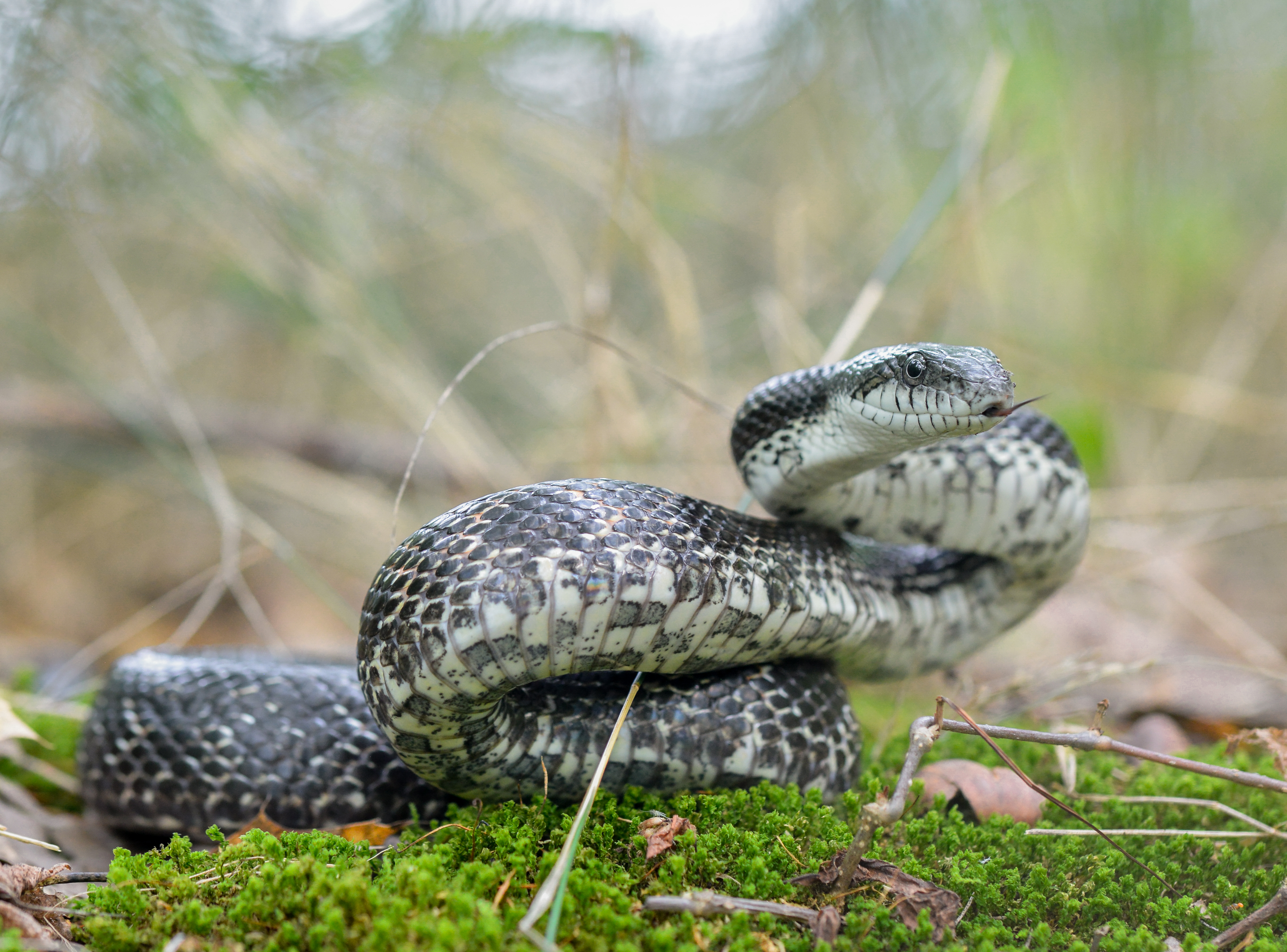
Adult Pantherophis spiloides (gray ratsnake); eggs in the communal nests of these snakes are used by Nicrophorus pustulatus beetles to raise their broods

N. pustulatus is unique among beetles in the genus Nicrophorus as the only species that has been demonstrated to use the eggs of oviparous reptiles as a food source to raise larvae, in addition to carrion. This is an example of a host shift relative to the hypothesized ancestral life history of Nicrophorus beetles. N. pustulatus adults locate reptile eggs, oviposit next to the eggs, open holes in the shells, and then feed their broods from this resource - killing the eggs. The reptile eggs are otherwise alive and viable when the beetles attack them, making N. pustulatus a parasitoid. The discovery of this host shift may have been the first scientifically published example of a true parasitoid using a vertebrate species as a host.

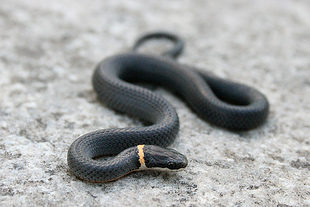
Adult Diadophis punctatus edwardsii (northern ringneck snake); N. pustulatus beetles have been found using the eggs of this species

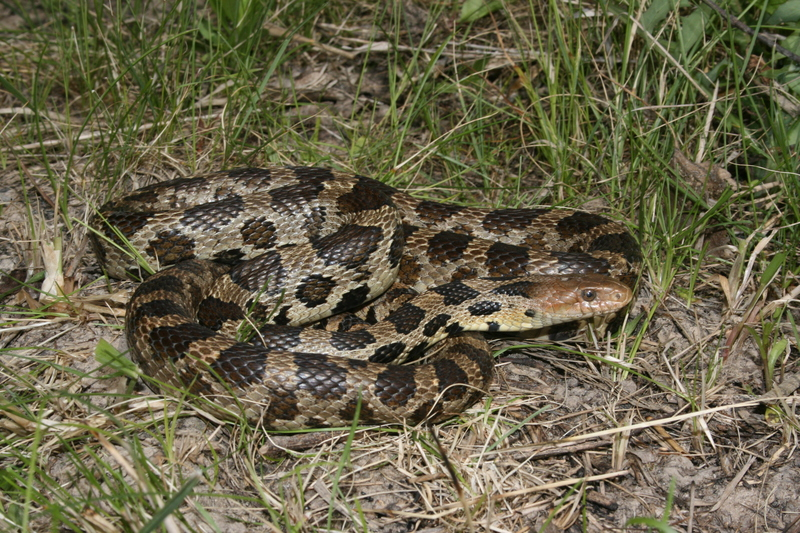
Adult Pantherophis vulpinus (foxsnake); N. pustulatus beetles have been found using the eggs of this species

In the wild, N. pustulatus has primarily been observed targeting Pantherophis spiloides (gray ratsnake) eggs. N. pustulatus appears to target this species commonly, with the abundance of N. pustulatus individuals caught in baited traps being significantly higher close to P. spiloides hibernacula. N. pustulatus has only been observed utilizing eggs in communal nests (where multiple snakes have oviposited) so far, which may be because communal nests are easier to locate or because they provide a larger amount of food. There have also been individual observations of N. pustulatus beetles targeting Diadophis punctatus edwardsii (northern ringneck snake) and P. vulpinus (foxsnake) eggs. In laboratory settings, N. pustulatus has successfully bred on Lamprophis fuliginosus (brown house snake) eggs. This suggests that N. pustulatus may be able to use a broad range of snake eggs, rather than behaving as a host-specific parasitoid. N. pustulatus has also successfully raised broods on Chelydra serpentina (common snapping turtle) and Chrysemys picta (painted turtle) eggs in captivity, but the breeding responses to turtle eggs are less rapid and consistent than to snake eggs.

It has been hypothesized that this parasitoid association evolved from brood parasitism behaviours, with adults digging into the soil to access failed reptile eggs instead of the brood ball of other species. From this point, the beetles may have evolved to utilize fresh, live eggs instead of just failed eggs. Many of the same behaviours involved in breeding on carrion are applied to snake eggs, including ovipositing near the resource, regulating brood size based on resource size, and manipulating the resource (such as opening holes) to increase accessibility for larvae. At the same time, other behaviours required for carrion are no longer applied to snake eggs, such as the removal of hair, rounding into a brood ball, and burial in an underground crypt. These differences suggest that the host shift to snake eggs may have adaptive benefits, given that the eggs require less energetic investment through preparation and burial and are found in large quantities in communal nests. Further, depositing beetle eggs near live snake eggs may be less risky, due to the absence of so-called "grave-soil microbes" found around decaying carcasses that can lead to beetle egg failure. An analysis weighing the potential costs and benefits of the host shift is required.

It is unclear to what extend wild populations use reptile eggs versus carrion to breed. It is possible that N. pustulatus exhibits host shifts across its range, taking advantage of different species of reptile eggs or carrion depending on the local relative availability of these resources. For example, utilization of carrion or turtle eggs could increase in the northern part of the N. pustulatus range, where oviparous snakes are absent.

In one experiment, N. orbicollis and N. defodiens did not respond to snake eggs with the same breeding behaviour as N. pustulatus, suggesting that the host shift may be unique to N. pustulatus.

=== Decomposition ===
Feeding and potentially breeding on vertebrate carrion makes N. pustulatus beetles important decomposers, contributing to nutrient cycling in the ecosystem and managing the buildup of carcasses. This may play a role in preventing the spread of diseases.

=== Interspecific competition ===
==== Other Nicrophorus species ====
In regions where multiple Nicrophorus species overlap, they may be in competition with each other for limited carrion resources. In southeastern Ontario, Canada, there are seven sympatric Nicrophorus species, including N. pustulatus and N. orbicollis. These two species have overlapping habitats, breeding periods, and carrion size requirements. In laboratory experiments, N. orbicollis has been shown to be the behaviourally dominant species. N. orbicollis typically overcomes N. pustulatus in aggressive competitions for carrion resources, with its larger body size conferring an advantage in chasing, grappling, digging, and fighting.

Interspecific competition for shared limiting resources is thought to have been a driving force influencing the natural histories of Nicrophorus beetles. The ecological divergence of N. pustulatus into a canopy specialist may represent spatial niche partitioning, which was selected for to reduce competition against larger and more dominant species. Niche partitioning amongst Nicrophorus beetles is thought to occur via spatial partitioning in habitat specialists (such as N. pustulatus), and via temporal partitioning of breeding periods among habitat generalists.

==== Other insects ====
N. pustulatus can be in competition with other insects that reproduce in carrion, such as other Coleoptera (beetle) and Diptera (fly) species. Nicrophorus beetles are generally adapted to detect and monopolize breeding resources quickly before other species can get established, and to rely on mutualistic relationships with mites that eat other larvae (see Phoresy below).

==== Vertebrates ====
N. pustulatus is also in competition with vertebrate scavengers and predators for food resources, such as the species Corvus brachyrhynchos (American crow), Procyon lotor (raccoon), Didelphis virginiana (Virginia opossum), and Mephitis mephitis (striped skunk). Burying carrion or utilizing snake eggs pre-concealed by the ovipositing female likely helps protect the breeding resources from other species.

=== Seasonal phenology ===
As canopy specialists, N. pustulatus beetles have evolved to rely on small birds and mammals in the canopy as important sources of carrion. One study in the Frontenac Arch region of Ontario, Canada found that the highest abundance of adult N. pustulatus beetles occurred during the period when most small birds and mammals species were breeding, which is when carrion would be most available due to offspring mortality. This suggests that the phenology of the life history and population dynamics in this species have evolved to coincide with the phenology of other canopy species that could provide carrion resources.

=== Predation ===
Reports of predation on N. pustulatus are rare. Insectivorous birds likely encounter adult N. pustulatus beetles frequently around carcasses, especially for bird species that scavenge on carrion themselves. N. pustulatus has been reported in the stomach of the birds Corvus brachyrhynchos (American crow) and Anas platyrhynchos (Mallard). However, an experimental trial offering insects to eight species of insectivorous birds determined that birds avoid N. pustulatus and other Nicrophorus beetles as food sources. This may be due to the aposematic colouration of these beetles, warning of noxious anal secretions. The orange and black aposematic colouration has been found to be highly visible to birds.

The buried carrion crypts or snake nests provide protection to N. pustulatus eggs and larvae from most predators. However, the eggs and larvae may be predated upon by species of Staphylinidae (rove beetles) or Acari (mites). The anti-predator defences exhibited by N. pustulatus parents - including fighting off other species and producing noxious anal secretions - suggest that past predation may have been a driving factor in the evolution of this species.

=== Phoresy ===
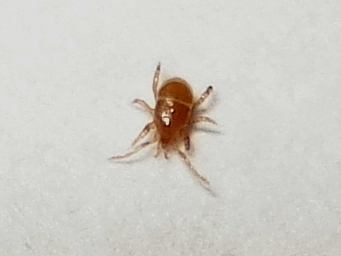
Adult mite in the genus Poechilochirus

N. pustulatus has coevolved with mites, which are phoretic on the beetle hosts. Mites in their final juvenile stage grab on to the legs of adult beetles and get transported back to the food that the beetle is preparing for its offspring. The mites will use the food in the beetle's brood chamber as a resource to complete their final stages of development, feeding on carrion, other insect eggs and larvae, and microorganisms. The mites either complete their development into adults and breed, leaving new mite offspring to disperse on the beetle offspring, or disperse early on the adult beetles. Reducing competition with fly larvae, nematodes, and other organisms on the carrion is beneficial for the burying beetles, making this aspect of the relationship mutualistic. However, the mites can also potentially compete for food resources or even consume the Nicrophorus beetle larvae. The balance between mutualism, commensalism, and exploitation depends on the density of mites, size of the beetle brood, and other environmental conditions, although mutualism and commensalism appear to be the predominant relationship types. N. pustulatus is known to host several species of generalist mites that associate with multiple Nicrophorus beetle hosts, and some monospecific host specialists that only engage in phoresy with this species - including some mites in the genus Poecilochirus.

=== Microbiome ===
Like other carrion beetles in the family Silphidae, N. pustulatus beetles harbour characteristic communities of bacterial and fungal endosymbionts in their gut, as well as in their oral and anal secretions. This microbiome facilitates the use of carrion or similar resources to feed larvae, by helping to preserve the food, prevent colonization by other microbes, detoxify compounds found in vertebrate tissue (such as urea), and digest nutrients that would otherwise be inaccessible to the beetles. Endosymbionts known to associate with the subfamily Nicrophorinae include bacteria in the groups Xanthomonadaceae, Enterobacteriaceae, Burkholderiaceae, Bacillaceae, Clostridiaceae, Bacteroidaceae, Ruminococcaceae, Lachnospiraceae, Erysipelotrichaceae, Oceanospirillaceae, and Neisseriaceae, and yeast species related to Yarrowia lipolytica. The species-level composition of the microbiome varies by location. Unlike other Nicrophorus species, the secretions produced by N. pustulatus do not have antimicrobial properties, which may be due to the microbial or enzymatic composition. The lack of antimicrobial secretions may be correlated with the evolution of brood parasitism in N. pustulatus.

== Senses and communication ==
=== Stridulation ===
Beetles in the genus Nicrophorus all stridulate, using a stridulatory ridge on the dorsal side of the abdomen at the posterior end of the elytra. The stridulatory ridge consists of two striated files on the fifth abdominal tergite, which are rasped against the underside of the elytra; this produces a series of pulses, at a frequency of approximately 300-8000 hertz. These vibrations have a low amplitude and travel a short distance. The characteristics of the sound do not differ between sexes, but do differ significantly between species. Stridulation is used by both males and females as a form of intraspecific communication during nest preparation, copulation, and interactions with the brood. Stridulation may also be used as a form of aposematic signal to defend against predators, however further experimental research confirming this is still required. In addition, some species in the genus Nicrophorus are Müllerian mimics that have evolved stridulatory patterns resembling the buzzing of bumblebees, although a mimicry relationship has not yet been described in N. pustulatus.

While it is known that these beetles use stridulation to communicate, the anatomical structure they use to hear those vibrations has not yet been identified. It remains unknown whether they perceive airborne sound or substrate-born vibrations.

Stridulation by Nicrophorus beetles was discussed by Charles Darwin in his book, "The Descent of Man and Selection in Relation to Sex," where he hypothesized that stridulation was a secondary sexual characteristic involved in mating interactions.

=== Chemoreception ===
The antennal clubs of Nicrophorus beetles have sensitive chemoreceptors that can detect volatile organic compounds released by fresh carcasses, such as sulphur-containing compounds. The chemoreceptors are a type of olfactory sensilla called sensilla coelosphaerica, which have a sac-like structure. This allows adults to detect carcasses within one day of death, and locate them via chemotaxis from up to several kilometres away. Adults generally detect olfactory cues while flying and then land in the area of the carcass to perform more sensitive chemotaxis by walking and moving their antennae back and forth, narrowing in on the precise location of a food source.

Chemical communication is used by males to attract females, either to mate and separate or to mate and raise a brood together. Males perform a "head-stand" movement to expose the last abdominal segment, where glandular cells produce sex pheromones. These pheromones are similarly received by females using the antennal chemoreceptors.

=== Vision ===
N. pustulatus has two large compound eyes, and two small, unpigmented ocelli on the lateral portions of the head. Vision has been shown to be less important for locating carcasses and mates than olfactory cues in this genus.

== Genetics ==
=== Genome ===
The genome of N. pustulatus has not yet been studied. Previous research on the related species N. vespilloides determined that the species is diploid, with six autosomes and an XO sex-determination system. N. sayi is also known to have this genome structure. However, further research on N. pustulatus will be required to assess whether this karyotype is shared, given that beetles exhibit considerable diversity in chromosome number and sex determination system due to chromosomal fission and fusion.

=== Genetic data ===
Several specimen records and associated sequences are available for N. pustulatus on the Barcode of Life Database (BOLD) System database, primarily from the Centre for Biodiversity Genomics at the University of Guelph in Ontario, Canada. These records all provide DNA barcode sequences from the Cytochrome C Oxidase Subunit I 5' locus of the N. pustulatus mitochondrial genome, which fall into one genetic cluster with one Barcode Index Number (BIN). The National Center for Biotechnology Information (NCBI) GenBank repository also has genetic records available for this species, including sequences from the mitochondrial Cytochrome C Oxidase Subunit I, nuclear protein coding CAD (carbamoylphosphate synthetase) gene, and nuclear 28S ribosomal RNA gene. No reference sequences for the whole genome or individual chromosomes are currently available.

Reference genome sequences are available for other members of the genus, including reference genomes for N. vespilloides (195.3 megabases, Mb), N. orbicollis (192.6 Mb), and N. investigator (202.3 Mb) as well as the complete mitochondrial genome for N. nepalensis (17,299 base pairs, bp).

== Conservation status ==
Unlike the critically endangered species N. americanus (American burying beetle), N. pustulatus does not currently have a conservation status on the IUCN Red List, or on the national conservation status lists across its range in North America - including those managed by the Committee on the Status of Endangered Wildlife in Canada (COSEWIC) and the United States Fish and Wildlife Service. NatureServe ranks the species as Secure globally and within Canada. Recent efforts using canopy traps targeting N. pustulatus indicate that the species may be common across its range.

N. pustulatus is not known to be a major invasive species outside of its native range.

Currently, N. pustulatus is most relevant to conservation efforts in North America as a threat to Pantherophis spiloides (gray ratsnake) and other oviparous snake populations as an egg parasitoid, leading to reduced fecundity. The beetles may destroy up to 100% of the eggs in the nests they target. P. spiloides populations are currently listed as Threatened (Great Lakes/St. Lawrence population) and Endangered (Carolinian population) in Canada by COSEWIC. This species does not have a listed conservation status under the United States Fish and Wildlife Service.

== Economic and other human importance ==
N. pustulatus has been the focus of laboratory and field-based research studies at many academic institutions, investigating the evolution, ecology, behaviour, and biology of the species.

N. pustulatus is not known to be a major agricultural pest, biological control agent, pet species, or vector of human disease.

Burying carrion makes it less available to other groups of insects that breed on vertebrate carcasses; thus, utilization of carrion by N. pustulatus could help reduce the populations of noxious fly species that would otherwise breed on the carrion.

Some species of carrion beetles are useful in forensic applications, as the post-mortem interval can be estimated based on the type and developmental stage of the larvae on a body. N. pustulatus may be an informative species for forensic entomology because it has been known to colonize large vertebrate carcasses. This species was observed on Sus scrofa L. (domestic pig) carcasses in a study by the Canadian Police Research Centre investigating potential arthropod succession on human bodies.

== See also ==
- Parental care
- Brood parasitism
- Parasitoidism
- Aposematism
- Phoresy
- Stridulation
- Chemoreception
- Forensic entomology
