= Nicrophorus pollinctor =

Nicrophorus pollinctor may refer to:

- Nicrophorus defodiens, misidentified in 1854 by LeConte
- Nicrophorus investigator, misidentified in 1853 by Mannerheim
