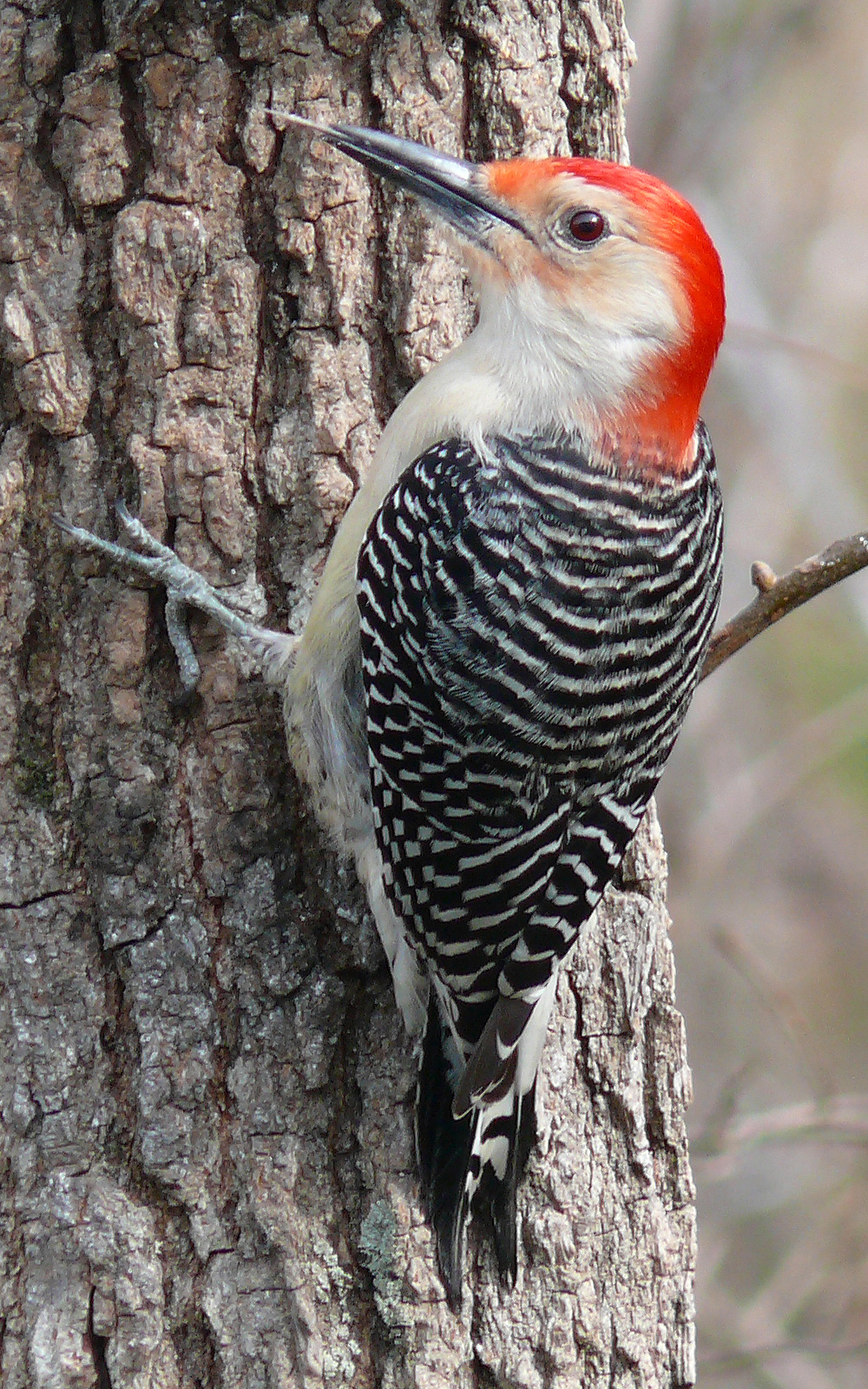
- Adult male

Conservation status
- Least Concern (IUCN 3.1)

Scientific classification
- Kingdom: Animalia
- Phylum: Chordata
- Class: Aves
- Order: Piciformes
- Family: Picidae
- Genus: Melanerpes
- Species: M. carolinus

Binomial name
- Melanerpes carolinus (Linnaeus, 1758)
- Approximate distribution map Year-round

Synonyms
- Centurus carolinus Picus carolinus Linnaeus, 1758

Audio
- Call (Blue jay in background)

= Red-bellied woodpecker =

Species of bird

The red-bellied woodpecker (Melanerpes carolinus) is a medium-sized woodpecker of the family Picidae. It breeds mainly in the eastern United States, ranging as far south as Florida and as far north as Canada. Though it has a vivid orange-red crown and nape it is not to be confused with the red-headed woodpecker, a separate species of woodpecker in the same genus with an entirely red head and neck that sports a solid black back and white belly. The red-bellied earns its name from the pale reddish tint on its lower underside.

== Taxonomy ==
The English naturalist Mark Catesby described and illustrated the red-bellied woodpecker in his book The Natural History of Carolina, Florida and the Bahama Islands which was published between 1729 and 1732. Catesby used the English name "The Red-bellied Wood-pecker" and the Latin Picus ventre rubro. When in 1758 the Swedish naturalist Carl Linnaeus updated his Systema Naturae for the tenth edition, he included the red-bellied woodpecker, coined the binomial name Picus carolinus and cited Catesby's book. Linnaeus specified the type locality as America septentrionali (North America). The locality is now restricted to South Carolina. The red-bellied woodpecker is one of 24 species now placed in the genus Melanerpes that was introduced by the English ornithologist William Swainson in 1832. The species is monotypic: no subspecies are recognised.

== Description ==
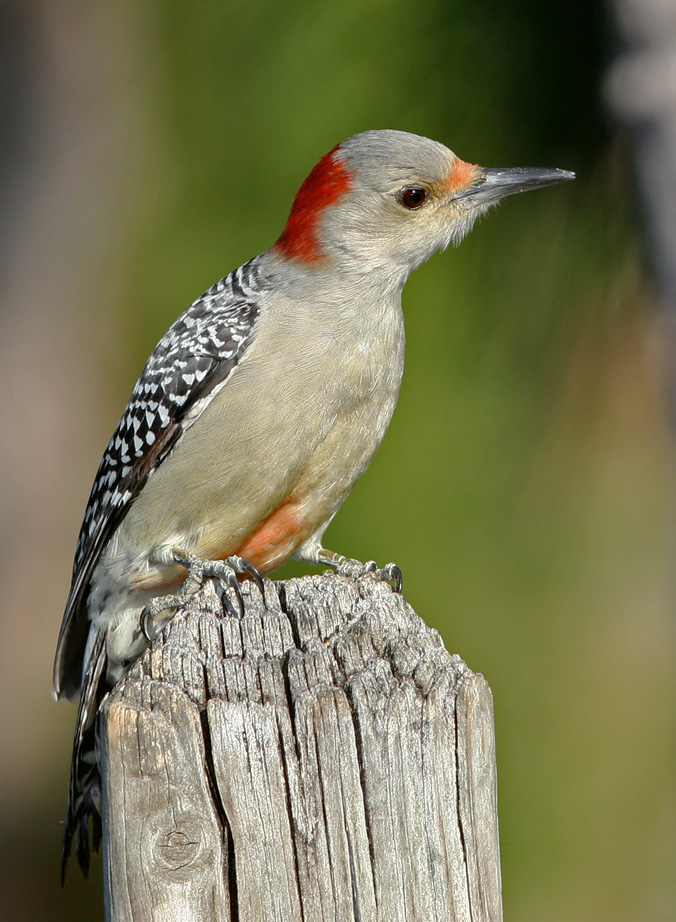
Adult female – showing reddish lower belly

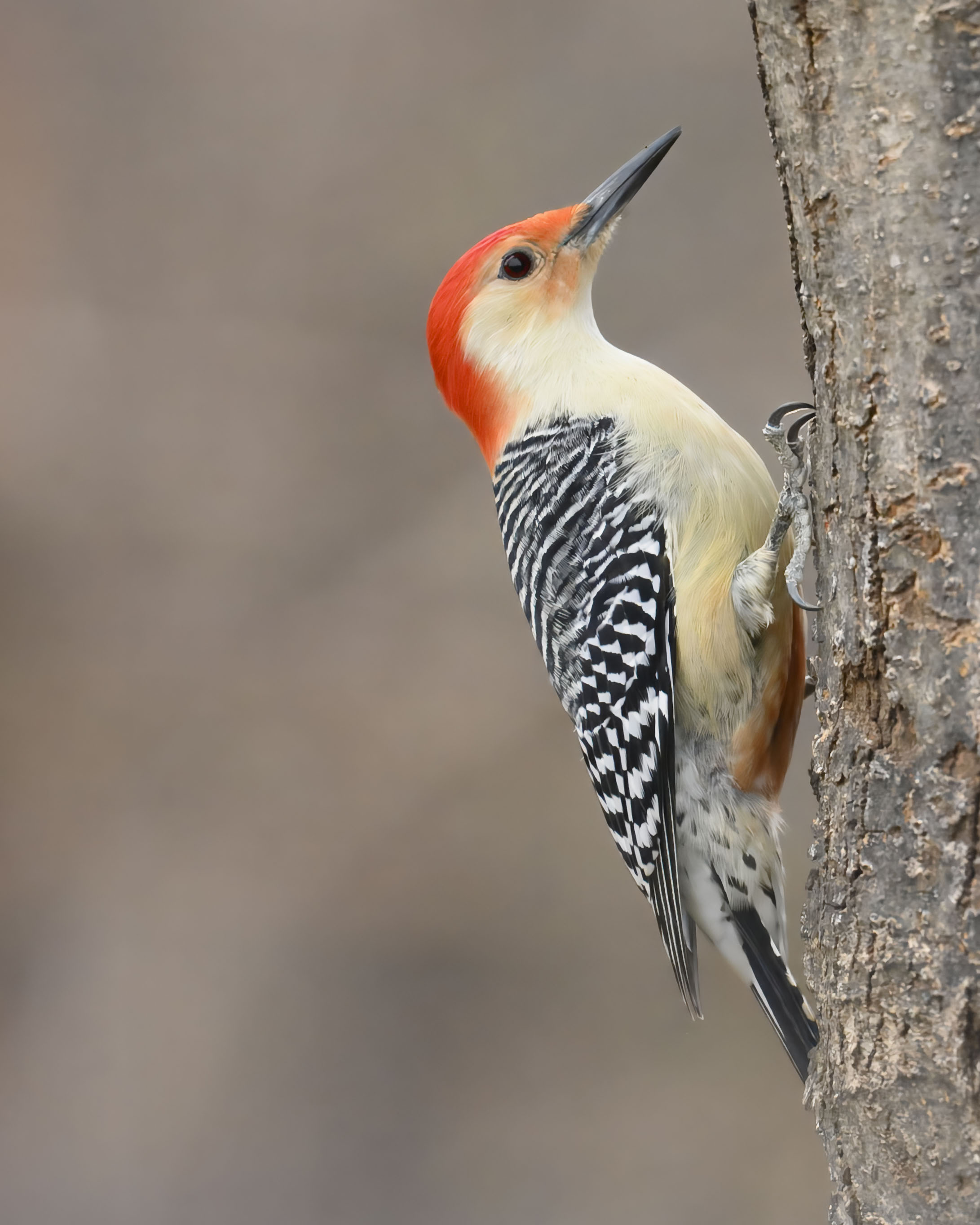
A red-bellied woodpecker seen at an angle from which its rosy belly is visible. An observer does not always get a good glimpse of the red belly.

Adults are mainly light gray on the face and underparts; they have black and white barred patterns on their back, wings and tail. Adult males have a red cap going from the bill to the nape; females have a red patch on the nape and another above the bill. The reddish tinge on the belly that gives the bird its name is difficult to see in field identification. White patches become visible on the wings in flight. Red-bellied woodpeckers are 22.85 to 26.7 cm (9.00 to 10.51 in) long, have a wingspan of 38 to 46 cm (15 to 18 in), and weigh 2.0–3.2 oz (57–91 g).

=== Vocalizations ===
Red-bellied woodpeckers are noisy birds, and have many varied calls. Calls have been described as sounding like churr-churr-churr or thrraa-thrraa-thrraa with an alternating br-r-r-r-t sound. Males tend to call and drum more frequently than females, but both sexes call. The drum sounds like 6 taps. Often, these woodpeckers "drum" to attract mates. They tap on hollow trees, and even on aluminum roofs, metal guttering and transformer boxes in urban environments, to communicate with potential partners. Babies have a high-pitched begging call of pree-pree-pree. They will continue to give a begging call whenever they see their parents for a while after fledging.

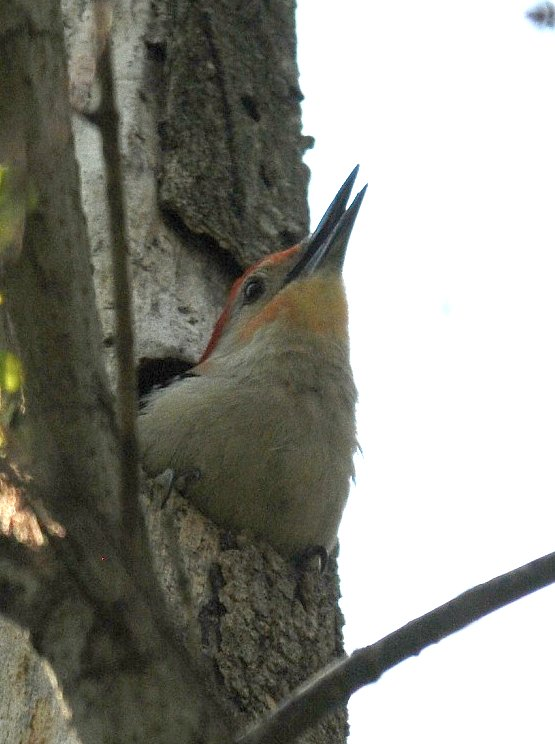
Peeking out of its nest

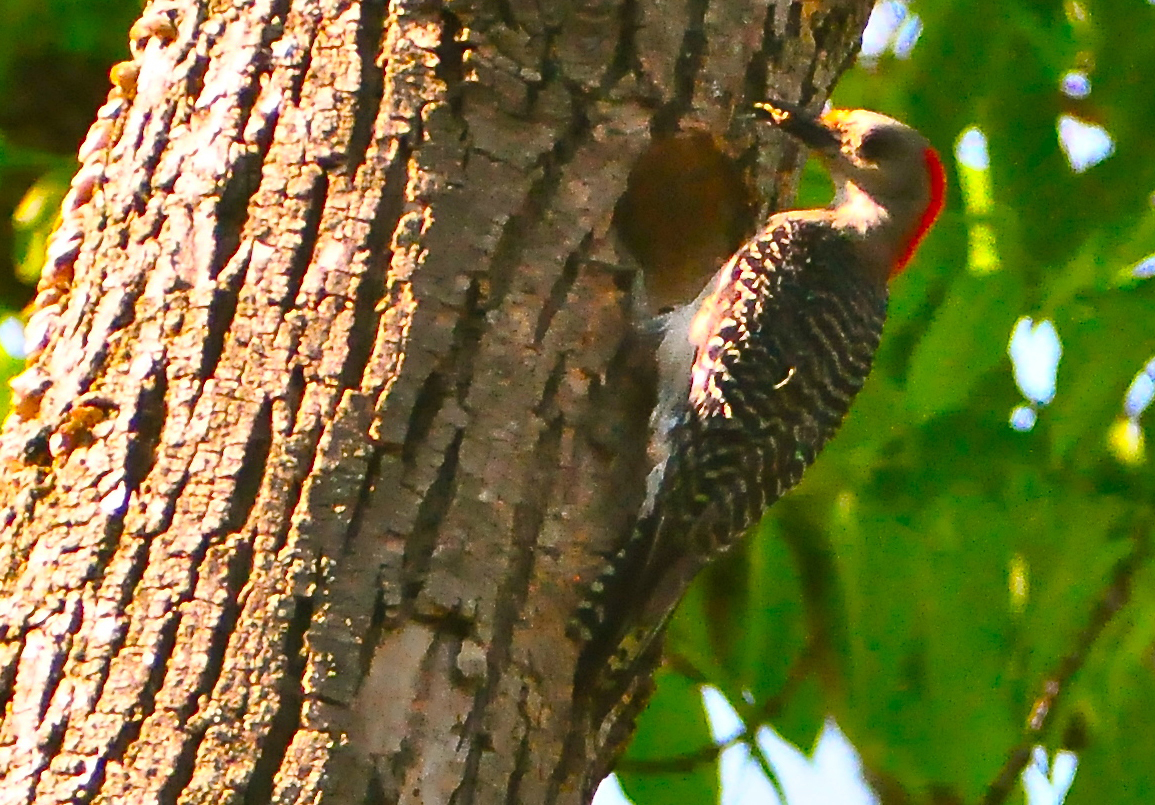
A female feeding her chick

== Behavior and ecology ==
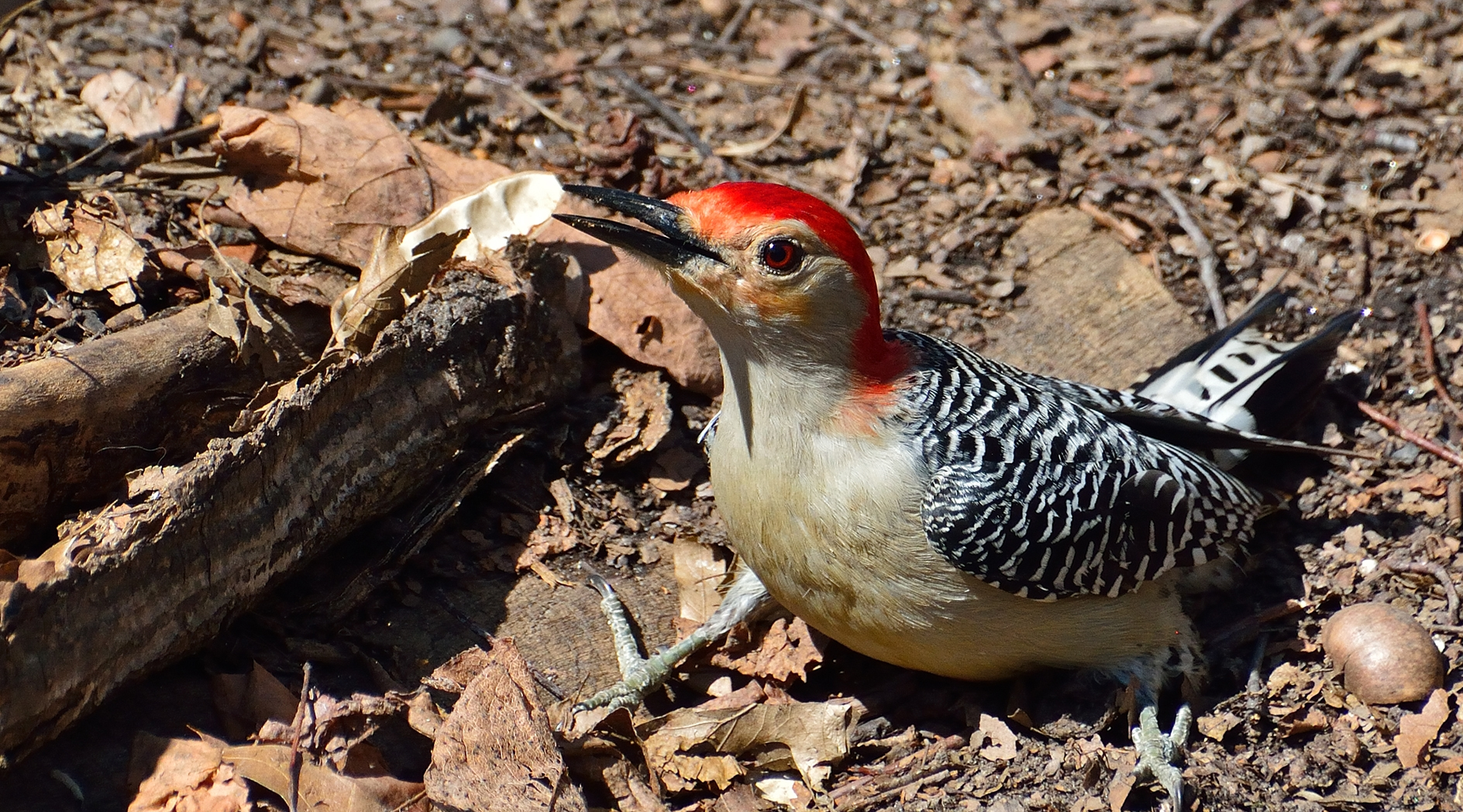
Red-bellied woodpecker feeding on the ground, Central Park, New York City

These birds mainly search out arthropods on tree trunks. They rarely catch insects in flight. They are omnivores, eating insects, fruits, nuts and seeds. In some parts of their range, they will also consume the eggs of box-nesting Wood ducks.

Their breeding habitat is usually deciduous forests. They nest in the decayed cavities of dead trees, old stumps, or in live trees that have softer wood such as elms, maples, or willows; both sexes assist in digging nesting cavities. Areas around nest sites are marked with drilling holes to warn others away.

Though the species is not globally threatened, it depends on large trees for nesting. In areas that are extensively deforested, the birds will sometimes utilize gardens, but for the most part they simply will not be present in any numbers.

=== Breeding ===
In early May, the red-bellied woodpeckers begin breeding activities by drumming patterns, such as slow taps followed by short rapid drumming. The red-bellied woodpeckers use vocal signals to attract and communicate with potential mates. A low "grr, grr" sound is observed in a pair of woodpeckers from the start of courtship until the end of the breeding season. In an intraspecific conflict, red-bellied woodpeckers usually make a loud "chee-wuck, chee-wuck, chee-wuck" sound. As indicated by Kilham 1983, the red-bellied woodpecker drums with its bill during conflict situation and taps to maintain pair bonding. An example of a conflict event would be competing for the same mate. Nevertheless, red-bellied woodpeckers are known to be in monogamous relationships. They have been known to rapidly peck on aluminum gutters of houses to produce a loud noise in order to attract females.

Woodpeckers depend on dead and drying wood for nesting purposes. The male red-bellied woodpecker takes the initiative in locating a nest hole. He will then seek approval from his mate by mutual tapping. The red-bellied woodpecker excavates holes in trees for nesting and roosting. By excavating cavities, they play an important role in forest communities for other species as well. For example, squirrels and bats use these cavities as shelter. The female red-bellied woodpecker accepts the nesting site by completing the excavation and entering the nest hole.

Researchers have documented that red-bellied woodpeckers tend to nest in clear areas with only a few trees. Studies have indicated that close canopy areas do not impact the bird's nesting behavior; however, further studies are needed and are in progress. Red-bellied woodpeckers breed once per year and are territorial during the nesting season. A pair begins nesting in April or May holding a year-round territory and showing high site fidelity.

Red-bellied woodpeckers depend on dead trees for nesting. Recent studies have shown that these woodpeckers experienced low breeding due to cutting sites of dead trees; however, predators are still of main concern. The juvenile red-bellied woodpecker is ready to fledge at 24 to 26 days of age. Natal dispersal has been observed in juvenile red-bellied woodpeckers. The juvenile red-bellied woodpecker remains in its natal area for approximately 27 weeks after fledging. In some cases, the woodpecker may return to its natal area for breeding, depending on predation levels and food resources.

== Food and feeding ==
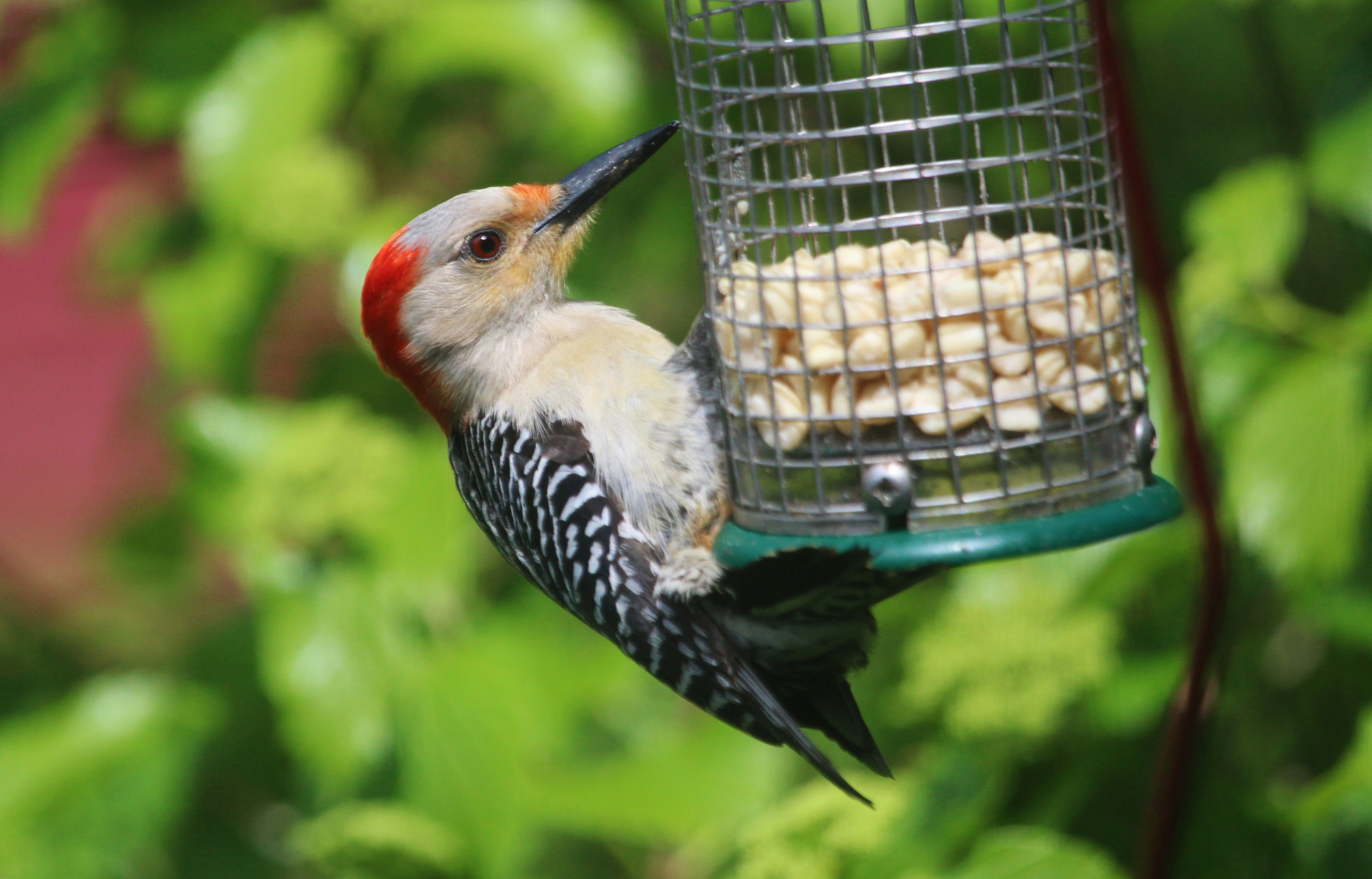
Red-bellied woodpecker feeding on peanut halves from a bird feeder in Pennsylvania

The woodpecker uses its bill as a chisel, drilling into bark or probing cracks on trunk of trees. In this manner, it is able to pull out beetles and other insects from the tree with the help of its long tongue. Field observations indicate that woodpeckers partake extensively in food storage, hiding items such as berries and acorns deep within natural crevices to protect them from interspecific competitors. According to studies from Williams (1975), Breitwisch (1977), and Williams and Batzil (1979), the red-bellied woodpecker spent 20% to 69% of its time foraging on dead or decaying trees. In addition, Breitwisch (1977) observed red-bellied woodpeckers primarily gleaning and probing to find food in South Florida pine habitat. The red-bellied woodpecker relies on snags or dying trees for foraging and nesting. It is a major predator of the invasive emerald ash borer in the U.S. Midwest, removing up to 85 percent of borer larvae in a single infested ash tree. The red-bellied woodpecker has also been observed, on occasion, foraging on the ground amongst groups of northern flicker woodpeckers.

== Predation ==
Predators of adult red-bellied woodpeckers include birds of prey such as sharp-shinned hawks and Cooper's hawks, black rat snake, and house cats. Known predators of nestlings and eggs include red-headed woodpeckers, owls, pileated woodpeckers, eastern gray squirrels, fox squirrels, and gray rat snakes. When approached by a predator, red-bellied woodpeckers either hide from it or harass it with alarm calls. They defend their nests and young aggressively, and may directly attack predators that come near the nest.
