= Yellow rat snake =

Yellow rat snake may refer to:

- Spilotes pullatus, a large nonvenomous colubrid snake endemic to Mesoamerica
- Pantherophis quadrivittatus, a large nonvenomous colubrid snake endemic to the southeastern United States
