= Black rat snake =

Black rat snake may refer to:

- Pantherophis alleghaniensis, the central ratsnake
- Pantherophis quadrivittatus, the eastern ratsnake
- Pantherophis obsoletus, the western ratsnake
