= E. tenuicornis =

E. tenuicornis may refer to:

- Elenchus tenuicornis, a strepsipteran insect species, parasitizing delphacid planthoppers.
- Eonecrophorus tenuicornis, a carrion beetle species found in eastern Nepal
