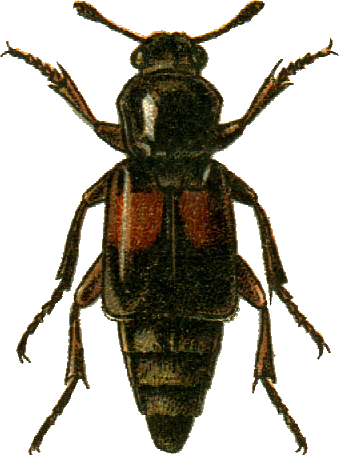
- Ptomascopus plagiatus

Scientific classification
- Kingdom: Animalia
- Phylum: Arthropoda
- Clade: Pancrustacea
- Class: Insecta
- Order: Coleoptera
- Suborder: Polyphaga
- Infraorder: Staphyliniformia
- Family: Staphylinidae
- Tribe: Nicrophorini
- Genus: Ptomascopus; Kraatz, 1876

= Ptomascopus =

Genus of beetles

Ptomascopus is a genus of beetles in the subfamily Nicrophorinae that contains the following species:

- Ptomascopus morio Kraatz, 1877
- Ptomascopus plagiatus Ménétriés, 1854
- Ptomascopus zhangla Háva, Schneider & Růžička, 1999
- † Ptomascopus aveyronensis Flach, 1890
