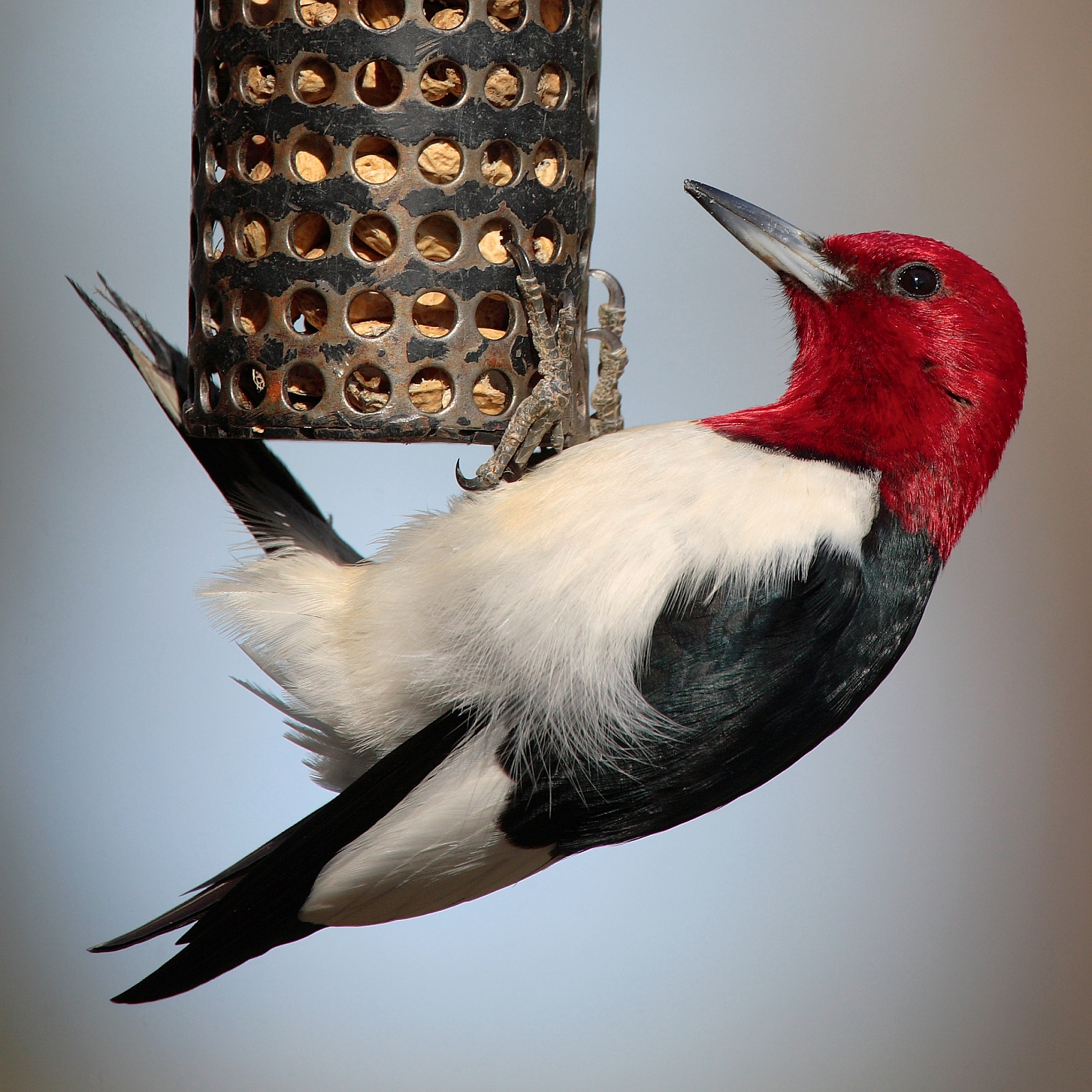
- At a bird feeder in Rondeau Provincial Park, Ontario

Conservation status
- Least Concern (IUCN 3.1)

Scientific classification
- Kingdom: Animalia
- Phylum: Chordata
- Class: Aves
- Order: Piciformes
- Family: Picidae
- Genus: Melanerpes
- Species: M. erythrocephalus

Binomial name
- Melanerpes erythrocephalus (Linnaeus, 1758)
- Approximate distribution map Breeding Year-round Nonbreeding

Synonyms
- Picus erythrocephalus Linnaeus, 1758

= Red-headed woodpecker =

Species of bird

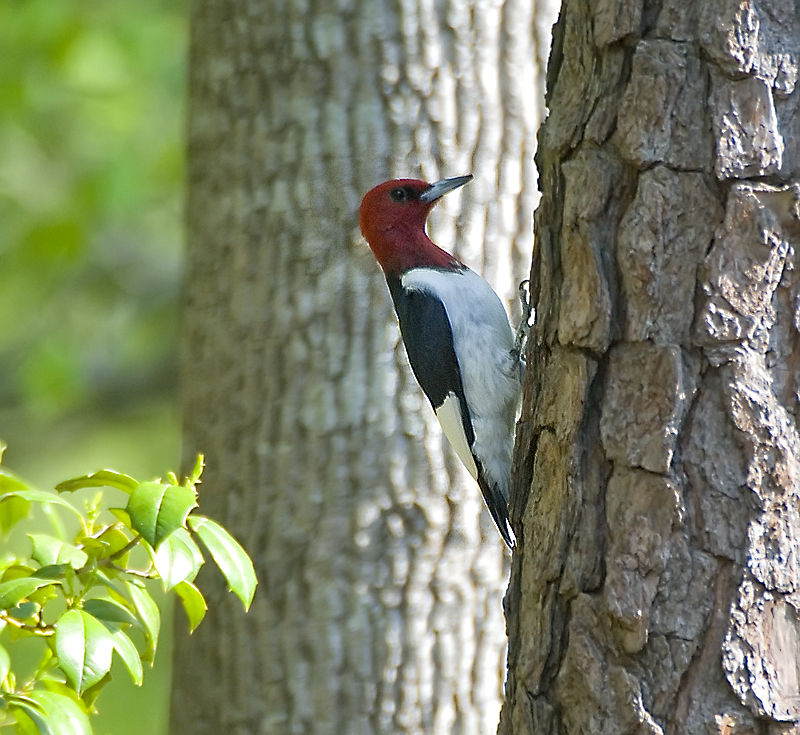
Adult males and females are identical in size and plumage.

The red-headed woodpecker (Melanerpes erythrocephalus) is a mid-sized woodpecker found in temperate North America. Its breeding habitat is open country across southern Canada and the east-central United States. It is rated as least concern on the International Union for Conservation of Nature (IUCN)'s Red List of Endangered species, having been down-listed from near threatened in 2018.

The red-headed woodpecker should not be confused with the red-bellied woodpecker, which is similar in size but has a vibrant orange-red crown and nape; the red-bellied woodpecker is named for the pale reddish blush of its lower belly and has a distinctly patterned black and white back rather than the solid black one of the red-headed woodpecker.

== Taxonomy ==
The English naturalist Mark Catesby described and illustrated the red-headed woodpecker in his book The Natural History of Carolina, Florida and the Bahama Islands, which was published between 1729 and 1732. Catesby used the English name "The Red-headed Wood-pecker" and the Latin Picus capite toto rubro. In 1758, the Swedish naturalist Carl Linnaeus updated his Systema Naturae to its tenth edition. He included the red-headed woodpecker and coined the binomial name Picus erythrocephalus, citing Catesby's book. The specific epithet combines the Classical Greek ἐρυθρός, eruthros, meaning "red", and κεφαλή, kephalos meaning "headed". The type locality is South Carolina. The red-headed woodpecker is one of 24 species now placed in the genus Melanerpes, which was introduced by the English ornithologist William Swainson in 1832 specifically to accommodate the red-headed woodpecker. The species is monotypic: no subspecies are recognized.

== Description ==
Adults are distinctly tricolored, with a black back and tail, a white belly and rump, and a red head and neck. The wings are black with white secondary flight feathers. A triangular patch of white, sometimes called a "saddle" or "backpack", is visible on the lower back when perched with its wing folded. Adult males and females are identical in plumage. Juveniles have similar markings to adults, but their heads are grey. Red-headed woodpeckers are entirely crimson above their shoulders.

These are mid-sized woodpeckers. Both sexes measure from 19 to 25 cm (7.5 to 9.8 in) in length, with a wingspan of 42.5 cm (16.7 in). They weigh from 56 to 97 g (2.0 to 3.4 oz), with an average of 76 g (2.7 oz). Each wing measures 12.7–15 cm (5.0–5.9 in); the tail measures 6.6–8.5 cm (2.6–3.3 in), the bill measures 2.1–3 cm (0.83–1.18 in) and the tarsus measures 1.9–2.5 cm (0.75–0.98 in). The maximum longevity in the wild is 9.9 years.

This species gives a tchur-tchur call or a drum on its territory.

== Behavior ==
=== Food and feeding ===
The red-headed woodpecker is omnivorous, eating insects, seeds, fruits, berries, nuts, and occasionally small rodents―even the eggs of other birds. About two-thirds of its diet consists of plants. Red-headed woodpeckers keep food caches. This behavior is only seen in three other species of woodpeckers: the acorn woodpecker, the downy woodpecker, and the red-bellied woodpecker. They have been known to stuff food in tree cavities, crevices, and under tree bark. This keeps them well fed throughout the year.

=== Breeding ===
During the breeding season, a mature male red-headed woodpecker will establish a territory and begin calling and drumming to attract a mate. Once the male has paired with a female, the relationship is believed to be mostly monogamous, and that they will remain paired for multiple breeding seasons. It is uncertain whether these relationships are truly monogamous as there have been reports of polygyny.

=== Nesting ===
When in an established territory, the parents become very territorial. They have been known to destroy nests and eggs of other birds in their territory. Females choose the location of their new nesting cavity, indicating their choice by tapping on a site. This site could be a natural cavity, the wintering cavity used by the male, a cavity used the season before, a fence post, utility poles, or a dead tree. If the chosen site does not already have a nesting cavity, then both parents will drill out the nesting cavity, though the male will do most of the work. The chosen locations of these cavities are mostly in dead trees or utility poles between 2.45 and 24.5 m (8.0 and 80.4 ft) above the ground. In early May, the female lays four to seven white eggs, which are incubated for two weeks. The female incubates the eggs during the day and the male takes over at night. After hatching, the young are cared for by both parents. The young will stay in the nest until they are old enough to fledge, which is usually after 27 to 31 days. After the first brood leaves the nest, the parents may start a second brood while still taking care of the fledglings from the first brood, though the first brood will not need as much care. This second brood may be raised in the same nesting cavity as the first, but it is common for the parents to make a fresh nesting cavity. The fledglings are proficient flyers, and most are able to feed and care for themselves without too much help from the parents. Most of the fledglings will disperse on their own within a couple of weeks, but if a fledgling is still in the territory after a few weeks the parents will chase them out to force them to disperse. Two broods can be raised in a single nesting season.

=== Migration ===
By late October, northern birds typically begin to migrate to the southern parts of the range to overwinter. The overwintering range of this species has expanded further north, likely a result of climate change. Red-headed woodpeckers have recently been observed in northern parts of Wisconsin during winter, despite this not being considered typical for the species. Migrating birds typically return to their breeding range by late April. Southern birds are less likely to migrate when compared to their northern counterparts.

== Status ==
The red-headed woodpecker was returned to a designation of least concern on the International Union for Conservation of Nature (IUCN)'s Red List of Endangered Species in 2018, having been downgraded to near threatened in 2004 after it appeared to have experienced a 65.5% decline in population over 40 years. From 1966 to 2015 there was a greater than 1.5% annual population decline throughout the Mississippi and Ohio River valleys and central Florida. Most of the decline in red-headed Woodpeckers can be attributed to loss of habitat and the competition for nesting cavities with the invasive European starling.

Increased habitat management is claimed to have helped in part in stabilizing its numbers, leading to its down-listing.

The red-headed woodpecker was historically a common species in southern Canada and the east-central United States. Consistent long-term population declines have resulted in red-headed woodpecker's threatened status in Canada and several states in the US. Throughout most of its range, it inhabits areas that have been heavily altered by humans. Factors attributed to the red-headed woodpecker's decline include loss of overall habitat and, within habitats, loss of standing dead wood required for nest sites, limitations in food supply, and possible nest-site competition with other cavity nesters such as European starlings or red-bellied woodpeckers.

== Popular culture ==
In 1996, the United States Postal Service issued a 2-cent postage stamp depicting a perched red-headed woodpecker. The stamp was discontinued at some time thereafter, but re-issued in 1999 and remained available for purchase until 2006.
