= Palaeosilpha =

Scientific classification
- Kingdom: Animalia
- Phylum: Arthropoda
- Clade: Pancrustacea
- Class: Insecta
- Order: Coleoptera
- Suborder: Polyphaga
- Infraorder: Staphyliniformia
- Family: Staphylinidae
- Tribe: Nicrophorini
- Genus: †Palaeosilpha; Flach, 1890
- Species: †P. fraasii

Binomial name
- †Palaeosilpha fraasii Flach, 1890

Genus of beetles

Palaeosilpha fraasii is an extinct species of carrion beetle that lived during the Chattian, a subdivision of the Oligocene epoch.
