= Canadian Police Research Centre =

The Canadian Police Research Centre (CPRC; French: Centre Canadien de Recherches Policières) was established in 1979 as a partnership between the Canadian Association of Chiefs of Police, the Royal Canadian Mounted Police (RCMP), and the National Research Council of Canada (NRC) in order to provide a focal point for research relating to law enforcement. It is staffed by personnel from the RCMP and the NRC and is governed by an independent advisory board made up of representatives from police and other related organizations from across Canada.

In its Spring 2007 budget, the Canadian Federal Government announced the allocation of $10 million over the next two years to expand the CPRC activities and establish its headquarters in Regina.
