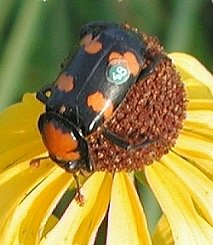
- American burying beetle

Scientific classification
- Kingdom: Animalia
- Phylum: Arthropoda
- Clade: Pancrustacea
- Class: Insecta
- Order: Coleoptera
- Suborder: Polyphaga
- Infraorder: Staphyliniformia
- Family: Staphylinidae
- Subfamily: Silphinae
- Tribe: Nicrophorini; Kirby, 1837

Extant genera
- Eonecrophorus; Nicrophorus; Proscapheus; Ptomascopus

= Nicrophorini =

Nicrophorinae Temporal range: Cenomanian–Recent

Subfamily of beetles

Nicrophorini is a tribe of burying beetles or carrion beetles in the subfamily Silphinae. It was formerly treated as subfamily Nicrophorinae within family Silphidae, but this family was found to be nested in family Staphylinidae in phylogenetic analyses and Silphidae was reassigned as a subfamily Staphylinidae.

== Genera ==
This beetle tribe contains the following genera:

=== Extant genera ===
- Eonecrophorus Kurosawa, 1985
- Nicrophorus Fabricius, 1775
- Proscapheus
- Ptomascopus Kraatz, 1876

=== Extinct genera ===
- †Cretosaja Sohn, Jae-Cheon & Gi Soo Nam, 2021
- †Palaeosilpha Flach, 1890
