= Nicrophorus hispaniola =

Scientific classification
- Kingdom: Animalia
- Phylum: Arthropoda
- Clade: Pancrustacea
- Class: Insecta
- Order: Coleoptera
- Suborder: Polyphaga
- Infraorder: Staphyliniformia
- Family: Staphylinidae
- Genus: Nicrophorus
- Species: N. hispaniola

Binomial name
- Nicrophorus hispaniola Sikes & Peck, 2000

Species of beetle

Nicrophorus hispaniola is a burying beetle described by Sikes and Peck in 2000. It is endemic to the southwestern mountainous Dominican Republic on the island of Hispaniola.
