= Eonecrophorus =

Scientific classification
- Kingdom: Animalia
- Phylum: Arthropoda
- Clade: Pancrustacea
- Class: Insecta
- Order: Coleoptera
- Suborder: Polyphaga
- Infraorder: Staphyliniformia
- Family: Staphylinidae
- Tribe: Nicrophorini
- Genus: Eonecrophorus; Kurosawa, 1985
- Species: E. tenuicornis

Binomial name
- Eonecrophorus tenuicornis Kurosawa, 1985

Genus of beetles

Eonecrophorus tenuicornis is a species of carrion beetle found in eastern Nepal. First described scientifically by Yoshihiko Kurosawa in 1985, E. tenuicornis is the only species in the genus Eonecrophorus.
