= Nicrophorus orbicollis =

Scientific classification
- Kingdom: Animalia
- Phylum: Arthropoda
- Class: Insecta
- Order: Coleoptera
- Suborder: Polyphaga
- Infraorder: Staphyliniformia
- Family: Staphylinidae
- Genus: Nicrophorus
- Species: N. orbicollis

Binomial name
- Nicrophorus orbicollis Say, 1825

Synonyms
- Necrophorus [sic] orbicollis Say, 1825; Necrophorus [sic] Hallii Kirby, 1837; Necrophorus [sic] 4-signatus Laporte, 1840

Species of beetle

Nicrophorus orbicollis is a nearctic burying beetle first described by Thomas Say in 1825. It is a member of the genus Nicrophorus or sexton beetles, comprising the most common beetles in the family Silphidae. This species is a decomposer feeding on carcasses of small dead animals. N. orbicollis can be used for scientific research both medically and forensically (if the beetle is present in the area).

== Morphology/taxonomy ==
Lateral view of N.orbicollis' setae and elytra.

=== Adult ===
Nicrophorus orbicollis is immediately recognized by its colorful orange markings on its elytra. The dorsal surface of the elytra is covered in long, fine setae, especially laterally, giving it a hairy appearance. The pronotum is spherical with wide lateral and basal margins. Its most distinctive feature from other Silphidae is its clubbed antennae with three orange apical segments and a black base. The posterior lobe of the metepimeron has a few brown hairs and the hind tibia is straight. The adult form is moderately sized at about 15–22 mm (0.59–0.87 in) long. N. orbicollis is known to be a saprophagous feeder. The adults feed on protein from smaller decomposing carcasses as well as supply these nutrients to their larvae.

=== Larva ===
Larval N.orbicollis differ from other Silphidae by widely separated labial palpi. They also contain ten abdominal segments with the sternum separated into sclerotized sternal units called sternites.

== Origin ==
It is thought that silphids, including N. orbicollis, arose in the early Mesozoic and spread to southern parts of Pangea before the separation into Laurasia and Gondwanaland. It is believed that Nicrophorus species originated in the Old World and that most species related to N. orbicollis originated in Mexico and Central and South America.

== Phenology and distribution ==
Nicrophorus orbicollis adults are active in the early spring with the first adult beetles emerging in late May. Reproduction occurs from June to August and teneral adults appear from late July to early August. This species spends the winter as an adult and is found mainly in open and forested habitats. Adults of the species are nocturnal. N. orbicollis is multivoltine with adults that care for their offspring during larval development. N. orbicollis is distributed from southeastern Canada to the southern tip of Florida and to East Texas; it has also been discovered as far west as Nebraska and as far north as North Dakota. N. orbicollis is the most frequently collected silphid species in the eastern United States. Adults can be collected from February to October but are most commonly found during the summer months from June to August as a result of their efficient activity in warm weather. Most N. orbicollis have been collected in mesic forest habitats on human and carnivore feces as well as on rotten fruit and carrion.

== Behavior ==
Nicrophorus orbicollis males will search for small bodies of animals such as chipmunks, rabbits, and toads in which to attract a mate. Once a body is located the male will proceed to climb onto the carcass and emit a pheromone to attract a mate. If another male enters the area, the two males will fight to the death and the winner will claim the carcass. Some males have been known to try to attract a mate without providing a carcass. These males will simply emit the pheromones even when they have not located a body. If females are attracted they will mate, but then continue to search for a mate that does have a carcass. Females are more likely to lay eggs fertilized by the most recent mate, so the males that have a carcass are more likely to actually pass on their genes. Once a male attracts a female, the pair will proceed to bury the animal carcass together, equally sharing the workload. If the carcass is too big for one pair, then it is acceptable for multiple pairs to work together to bury the carcass. Eggs are laid and buried very close to the carcass to provide a nearby source of nourishment. Unlike most beetle species, N. orbicollis parents will provide both food and protection for the larvae until pupation. It has also been observed that if one parent is killed the other parent will double up on the feeding and protection duties so the larvae do not suffer. Without parental care the larvae cannot usually survive until the point of pupation.

=== Interaction with mites ===
Nicrophorus orbicollis are sometimes seen interacting with other arthropods such as the mites of genus Poecilochirus. Commonly seen riding on the elytra of N. orbicollis, the mites of genus Poecilochirus use the beetle as a source of transportation. The two share a commensal relationship as the mites travels from carcass to carcass on the beetle in search for food. Fly eggs are generally the source of food for these mites, therefore, N.orbicollis does not compete with the mites in any form.

== Life cycle ==
Nicrophorus orbicollis is an endopterygote with complete metamorphosis; the life cycle consists of an egg, larval, pupal, and adult stage. Male and female beetles are attracted to carrion for reproduction and feeding. Male N. orbicollis attract females by emitting pheromones but they will only do so when a carcass is present. After mating, the female will lay her eggs from about 12–48 hours after discovering a suitable carcass. Eggs hatch around 56 hours after oviposition. Once larvae complete development they pupate in the soil in 6–8 days. The size of a carcass affects the time span an egg is laid to when the larvae disperse and so also affects the time frame the parent beetles spend taking care of their young. In general, the time spent from egg burial to larval dispersal is less on smaller carcasses. N. orbicollis males will also spend less time taking care of their offspring when on small carcasses. Larvae of most silphid species are dependent upon parental feeding but can sometimes feed directly from a carcass. N. orbicollis larvae, however, are extremely dependent upon their parents for feeding and will die before they develop to the second instar without parental care. Offspring mass is positively correlated with longer maternal care. N. orbicollis is nocturnal and must compete with dipterous larvae for oviposition locations on carcasses.

== Reproduction ==
Nicrophorus orbicollis depends on small vertebrate carcasses to supply their young with an adequate food requirement. N. orbicollis mates mid-June to early August and is mostly active after sunset. First, the male attracts the female by producing pheromones. Competition occurs between other burying beetles and other carrion competitors to secure a carcass for mating. It is commonly seen that N. orbicollis will compete with N. defodiens. The larger in size the beetle, the more likely it is to outcompete smaller beetles in acquiring a carcass. Once the carcass has been secured and buried, the female lays her eggs in the soil surrounding the carcass. The larvae typically hatch 5–7 days later. Both the female and male have important roles as their larvae mature. Preservation of the carcass, protecting the larvae from predators and feeding the larvae are all roles taken on by the adults. The males then disperse from the carcass once the larvae have reached the final instar. The females will stay until the larvae disperse into the soil to pupate, usually 17 days after carcass burial. Depending on the size of the carcass, the parents can control the number of offspring through a process called filial cannibalism. The parents do this to allow more space on a smaller carcass.

== Scientific importance ==
=== Economic and medical ===
Nicrophorus orbicollis have not been found to have a direct effect on the economy. This species does, however, play a very important role in recycling. These beetles take a decomposing carcass and turn it into nutrients for their larvae. They do this by burying a carcass (usually just two beetles, a male and a female) and feeding it to their young by regurgitation. These beetles secrete an antibiotic to delay decomposition in order to keep the competition away from the carcass so they will be able to feed their young.

There is little known about the medical importance of N. orbicollis. Their ability to recycle dead, decomposing matter plays an indirect role in the health of the areas it inhabits. Natural antibiotics secreted by this beetle could potentially be medically beneficial in the future but currently nothing is known about the method of secretion.

=== Forensic ===
The species has proven to be forensically important as well because it does not show up on the carcass until this has been exposed for several days. N. orbicollis show up after flies have arrived and feed on the fly larvae. This feeding on fly larvae can jeopardize the accuracy of a post mortem interval estimation because these beetles can consume an entire population of fly larvae if they have a sufficient amount of time to do so. N. orbicollis can help determine the length of time a carcass has been present in a certain area if the beetle occurs in the region. Within 12–48 hours of discovering a carcass, the female will lay eggs, which will hatch approximately 56 hours later in desirable temperatures of 20–25 °C (68–77 °F). N. orbicollis is unique in that it is a species in which the young are completely dependent upon their parents for survival. The adults bury the carcass to keep the tissue moist and to prevent it from being taken from them, and they feed their larvae the carcass through regurgitation. After 5–8 days, the larvae will crawl into the surrounding soil to pupate and will emerge approximately 2 weeks later as adults. These timelines and the stages of the lifecycle of this beetle found on a carcass can all contribute to determining a time of death for forensic investigators.

=== Future research ===
In the past few years, most research on N. orbicollis has been centered on the species’ unique parenting habits, which have been found in no other genus of beetles. This ensures that most future research will also be based on the evaluation of various specifics of the parental element in this species’ behavior. Other notable studies have been based on examining the competition for animal carcasses between N. orbicollis and other Nicrophorus species. However, one recent study in Ohio bred N. americanus in captivity and then released the beetles back into the wild. This study was used to evaluate the success rate of reintroduction in order to plan for a possible future attempt at increasing the population through assisted means.

== Notes and references ==
- Sikes, Derek S.; Madge, Ronald B. & Newton, Alfred F. (August 29, 2002). "A catalog of the Nicrophorinae (Coleoptera: Silphidae) of the world". Zootaxa. 65 (1): 1. doi:10.11646/zootaxa.65.1.1. ISBN 0-9582395-1-7. Archived (PDF) from the original on September 10, 2006.
