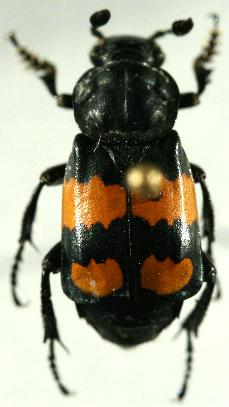

Conservation status
- Secure (NatureServe)

Scientific classification
- Kingdom: Animalia
- Phylum: Arthropoda
- Clade: Pancrustacea
- Class: Insecta
- Order: Coleoptera
- Suborder: Polyphaga
- Infraorder: Staphyliniformia
- Family: Staphylinidae
- Genus: Nicrophorus
- Species: N. defodiens

Binomial name
- Nicrophorus defodiens Mannerheim, 1846

Synonyms
- Necrophorus [sic] defodiens Mannerheim, 1846; Necrophorus [sic] pollinctor LeConte, 1854 (Preocc.); Necrophorus [sic] conversator Walker, 1866; Necrophorus [sic] plagiatus Motschulsky, 1870 (Preocc.); Necrophorus [sic] vespilloides v. lateralis Portevin, 1903

= Nicrophorus defodiens =

Species of beetle

Nicrophorus defodiens is a species of burying beetle described by Carl Gustaf Mannerheim in 1846.

In 2012, N. defodiens was found to be one of at least two burying beetles which can breed in the forest canopy.

== Biology ==
When it comes to mating, the males of N. defodiens use a pheromonal signal to attract their mate. During the mating period females often bite males. When copulation is over, the males' pheromone emission is resumed, but the female attempts to obstruct the male from attracting any additional females, thus imposing monogamy on the male. Unlike N. orbicollis this species produces twice as many eggs (roughly 23.9 in total).
