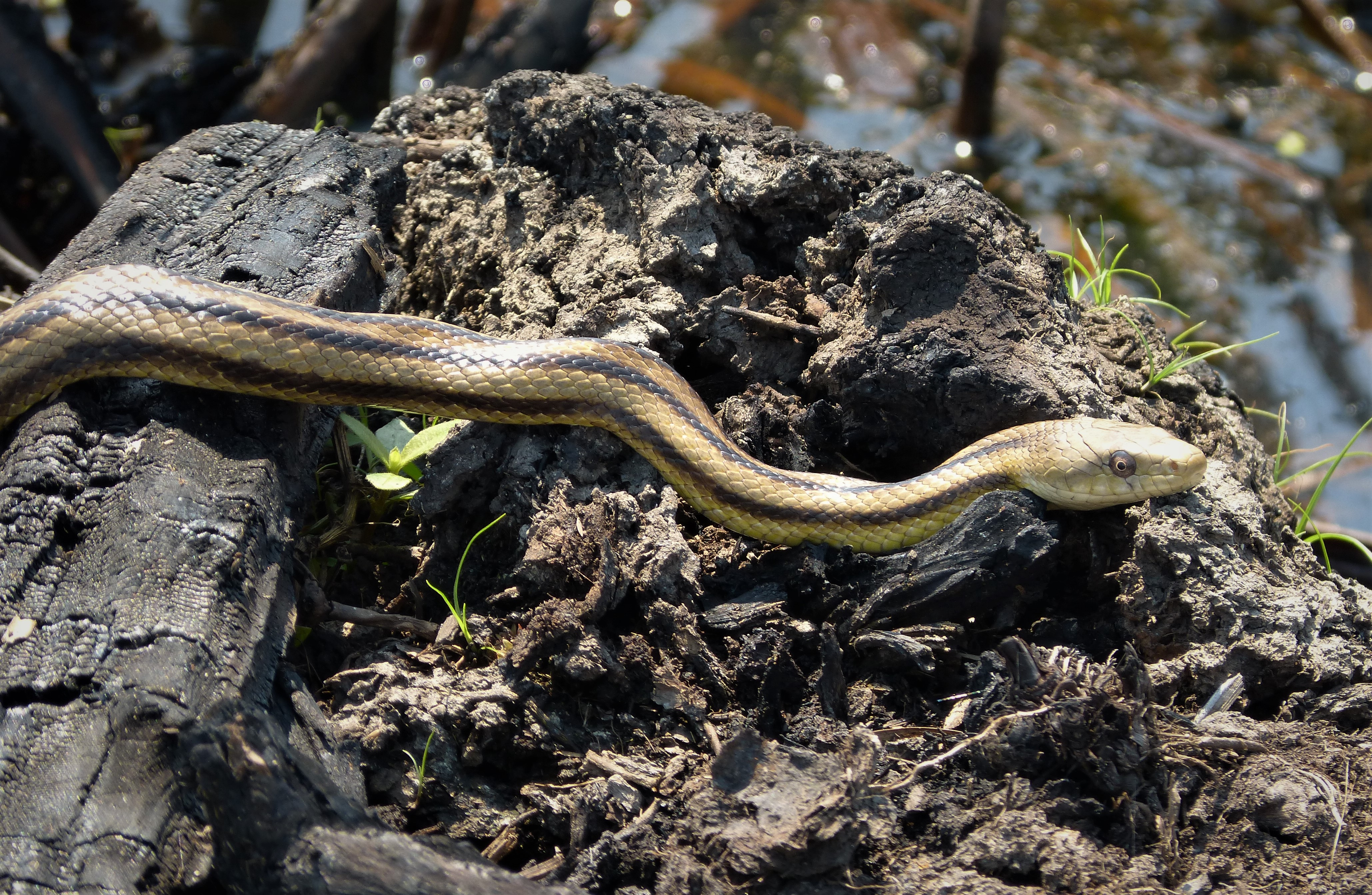
- Adult eastern ratsnake McIntosh County, Georgia

Conservation status
- Least Concern (IUCN 3.1)

- Apparently Secure (NatureServe)

Scientific classification
- Kingdom: Animalia
- Phylum: Chordata
- Class: Reptilia
- Order: Squamata
- Suborder: Serpentes
- Family: Colubridae
- Genus: Pantherophis
- Species: P. quadrivittatus

Binomial name
- Pantherophis quadrivittatus (Holbrook, 1836)

Synonyms
- Coluber quadrivittatus Holbrook, 1836; Coluber obsoletus — Boulenger, 1894 (part); Elaphe obsoleta — Stejneger & Barbour, 1917 (part); Elaphe alleghaniensis — Burbrink, 2001; Scotophis alleghaniensis — Collins & Taggart, 2008; Pantherophis alleghaniensis — Pyron & Burbrink, 2009; Pantherophis quadrivittatus — Burbrink, 2021

= Yellow ratsnake =

Species of snake

Pantherophis quadrivittatus, commonly called the yellow ratsnake or eastern ratsnake, is a species of nonvenomous snake in the family Colubridae. The species is endemic to North America.

== Etymology ==
The generic name Pantherophis, meaning "panther-like snake", is from Ancient Greek: πάνθηρ: pánthēr, "panther" and Ancient Greek: ὄφις: óphis, "snake".

The specific name quadrivittatus, meaning "four-striped," refers to the four stripes on the species in the southern part of its range.

== Common names ==
Additional common names for Pantherophis quadrivittatus include black rat snake, pilot snake, pilot black snake, chicken snake; and in Florida, yellow rat snake and Everglades rat snake.

== Geographic range ==
Pantherophis quadrivittatus is found in the United States east of the Apalachicola River in Florida, east of the Piedmont in Virginia, South Carolina, North Carolina, Georgia, and south to the Florida Keys. On the western and northern edges of its range, it readily hybridizes with the central ratsnake (Pantherophis alleghaniensis). The two species wide hybrid zone of up to 256 km (159 miles) in width and encompassing much of the northeastern United States and Piedmont, making species-level identification in these regions difficult.

== Description ==
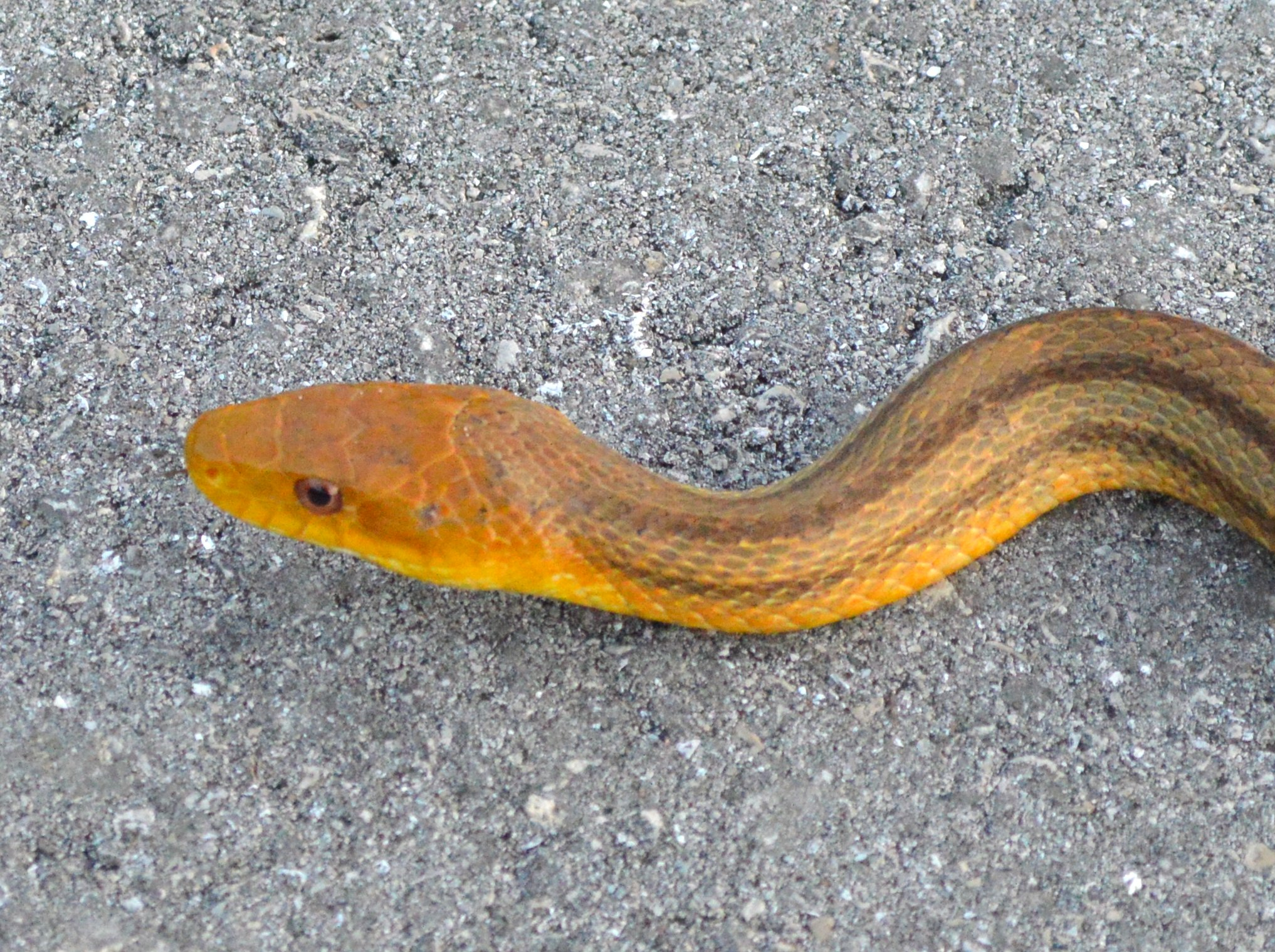
Yellow rat snake, Pantherophis quadrivittatus in Florida

Adult eastern rat snakes commonly measure 90 to 183 cm (2 ft 11 in to 6 ft 0 in) in total length (including tail), with a few exceeding 200 cm (6 ft 7 in). The longest recorded total length to date for an eastern rat snake is 228 cm (7 ft 6 in). A sample of eastern rat snakes, including juvenile and adult snakes, weighed from 54 to 1,274 g (0.119 to 2.809 lb). A further adult weighed 833 g (1.836 lb).

Adults in the north of its range are shiny black dorsally, with a cream or white chin and throat. White areas of skin can appear between scales. The belly has an irregular black-and-white checkerboard pattern, becoming uniformly slate gray towards the tail. Juveniles have 28 to 40 dark dorsal blotches on a grayish ground color. The ventral pattern in juveniles is the same as in adults. The eyes are round with a black pupil, with particularly in juveniles, but not always present in adults, a distinct white margin.

In the Florida Peninsula, adult rat snakes can be yellow, orange, tan, or gray, with four dark, longitudinal stripes.

In cross section, the bodies of rat snakes are not round, but instead resemble a loaf of bread.

The dorsal scales are weakly keeled, and are arranged in 23 to 27 rows at midbody.

Males and females have the same coloration. Males have proportionally longer tails (16–19% of total body length) compared to females (14–18% of total body length).

== Habitat ==
The eastern rat snake occurs in a variety of habitats, including farmlands, hardwood forests, forested wetlands, thickets and fields adjacent to forests, isolated urban woodlots, and backyards that support populations of prey species. The eastern rat snake does especially well in early successional and edge habitats. An arboreal species, it can get into human residences, where it may live in attics undetected. At the northern limits of its range, distribution appears to be restricted by the availability of suitable hibernating sites. In these climates, it requires southern exposures to receive maximal thermal benefit from the winter sun and to provide basking areas in early spring and late fall.

== Behavior and ecology ==
The eastern rat snake is primarily active at night during the summer, and diurnal in the spring and fall. It is a terrestrial burrower and an excellent climber, and it may enter water. It is found under rocks and boards, and in trees under bark and within knotholes and palm fronds. Eastern rat snakes have been found using water-filled cavities in trees, with many using the cavities at the same time. Gravid females were also four times more likely to use the water cavities than non-gravid females or male ratsnakes. Gravid females prefer edge habitat more extensively than males and non-gravid females, this is because of the need for gravid females to retain higher body temperature. The snake is a constrictor, and adults eat mainly endotherms, while young eat mainly ectotherms. The diet includes rodents, lizards, frogs, and birds and their eggs. The snakes can also eat young chickens and chicks, hence the common name chicken snake.

Rat snakes are most vulnerable to predators as juveniles. Predators of P. quadrivittatus include hawks (Buteo spp.), great horned owls (Bubo virginianus), foxes, raccoons, and domestic cats. Adult eastern rat snakes have few known predators other than humans. When frightened, a rat snake will freeze. If harassed, it will produce a foul-smelling musk to deter predators. If provoked further, it may coil, shake its tail, and snap at its attacker.

Eastern rat snakes hibernate during the winter underground or in deep crevices. They may congregate in the same dens with other species of snakes, such as copperheads (Agkistrodon contortrix), eastern racers (Coluber constrictor) and timber rattlesnakes (Crotalus horridus). In northern climes, the snakes are active from late April to October and mate in May or June. They are active earlier in the south.

== Reproduction ==
Eastern rat snakes are oviparous, and gaining nutrients for eggs is facilitated by the female maintaining her body temperature. They reach sexual maturity in their fourth year. The snakes start to breed in May and June, earlier in the south. Males approach females to initiate breeding, and may fight other males before breeding. About five weeks after mating, the female lays five to 27 eggs in hollow standing and fallen trees, compost and mulch heaps, sawdust piles, and decomposing logs. Incubation is about two months, and eggs hatch from July through September. Hatchlings are usually just over a foot long at birth, with the distinct gray-and-black pattern characteristic of juveniles.

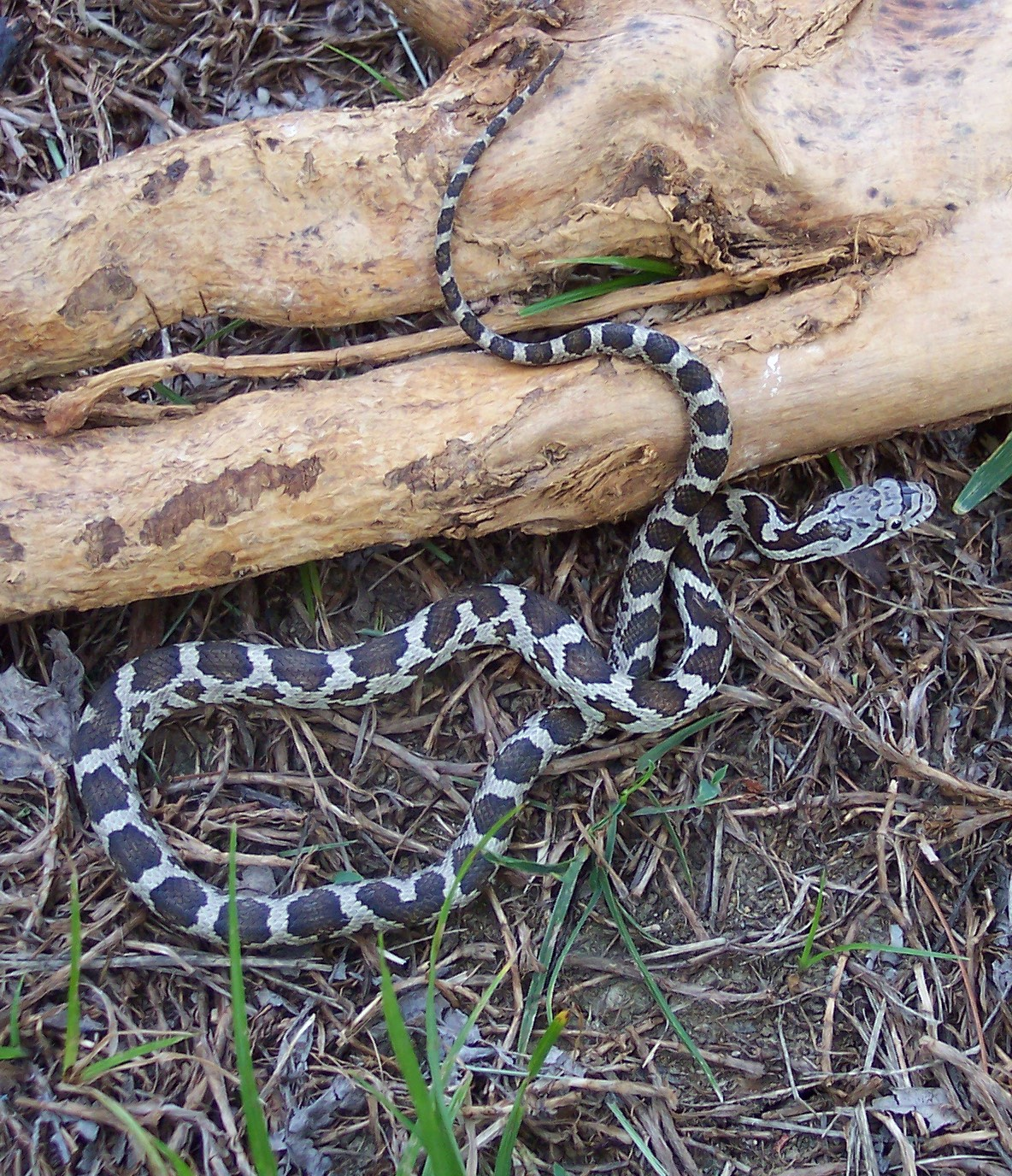
Juvenile yellow ratsnake showing its grey base color with dark blotches

== Taxonomy ==
Pantherophis quadrivittatus has sometimes been considered a subspecies of P. obsoletus, to which it is closely related.

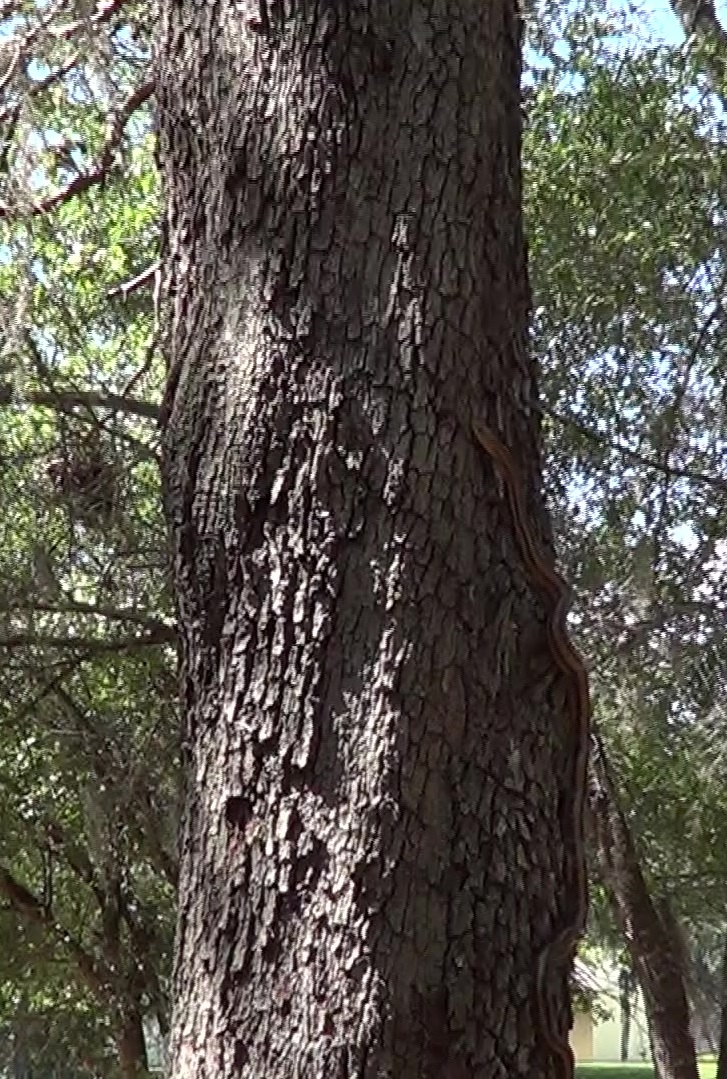
Opportunistic yellow ratsnake looking for prey atop live oak tree

This species has often been placed in the genus Elaphe, but recent phylogenetic analyses have resulted in its transfer to Pantherophis.

Previously, the eastern rat snake was assigned the binomial Pantherophis alleghaniensis and was thought to occupy the entire eastern seaboard north to Massachusetts. In 2021, genetic analysis found that the holotype for P. allegheniensis belongs to the species then known as Pantherophis spiloides, commonly called the gray or central ratsnake. The Central ratsnake species is now known to occupy a range between the Mississippi River in the west and the Piedmont in the east, north to New England. Due to the principle of priority, P. spiloides was reassigned to P. alleghaniensis. Therefore, the yellow ratsnake, the species distributed east and south of the Piedmont and on the Florida Peninsula, was reassigned to what had been the junior synonym Pantherophis quadrivittatus.
