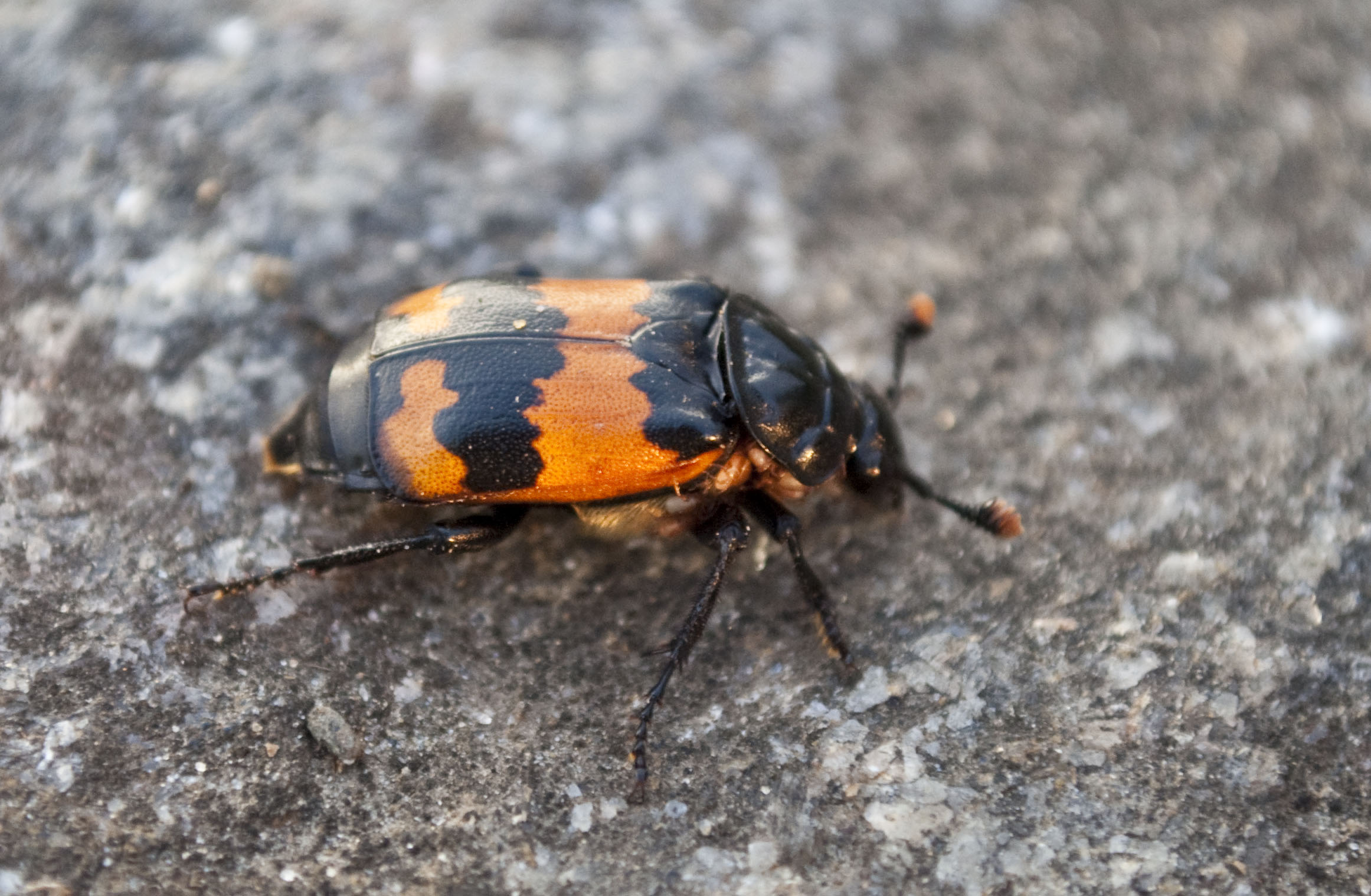

Scientific classification
- Kingdom: Animalia
- Phylum: Arthropoda
- Class: Insecta
- Order: Coleoptera
- Suborder: Polyphaga
- Infraorder: Staphyliniformia
- Family: Staphylinidae
- Genus: Nicrophorus
- Species: N. investigator

Binomial name
- Nicrophorus investigator Zetterstedt, 1824

Synonyms
- List: Necrophorus [sic] investigator Zetterstedt, 1824; Necrophorus [sic] maritimus Guérin-Ménéville, 1835; Necrophorus [sic] ruspator Erichson, 1837; Necrophorus [sic] Melsheimeri Kirby, 1837; Necrophorus [sic] particeps Fischer von Waldheim, 1844; Necrophorus [sic] aleuticus Gistel, 1848; Necrophorus [sic] pollinctor Mannerheim, 1853; Necrophorus [sic] infodiens Mannerheim, 1853; Necrophorus [sic] confossor LeConte, 1854; Necrophorus [sic] labiatus Motschulsky, 1860; Necrophorus [sic] sibiricus Motschulsky, 1860; Necrophorus [sic] microcephalus Thomson, 1862; Silpha funeror Reitter, 1884; Silpha praedator Reitter, 1887; Necrophorus [sic] latifasciatus Lewis, 1887; Necrophorus [sic] funerator Fauvel, 1890; Necrophorus [sic] investigator v. intermedius Reitter, 1895; Necrophorus [sic] interruptus v. submaculatus Reitter, 1895; Necrophorus [sic] investigator v. variolosus Portevin, 1924; Necrophorus [sic] baeckmanni Kieseritzky, 1930; Necrophorus [sic] (Necropter) chryseus Mazokhin-Porshnyakov, 1953; Necrophorus [sic] praedator insularis Lafer, 1989 (Preocc.)

= Nicrophorus investigator =

Species of beetle

Nicrophorus investigator is a burying beetle first described by the Swedish naturalist Johan Wilhelm Zetterstedt in 1824.
