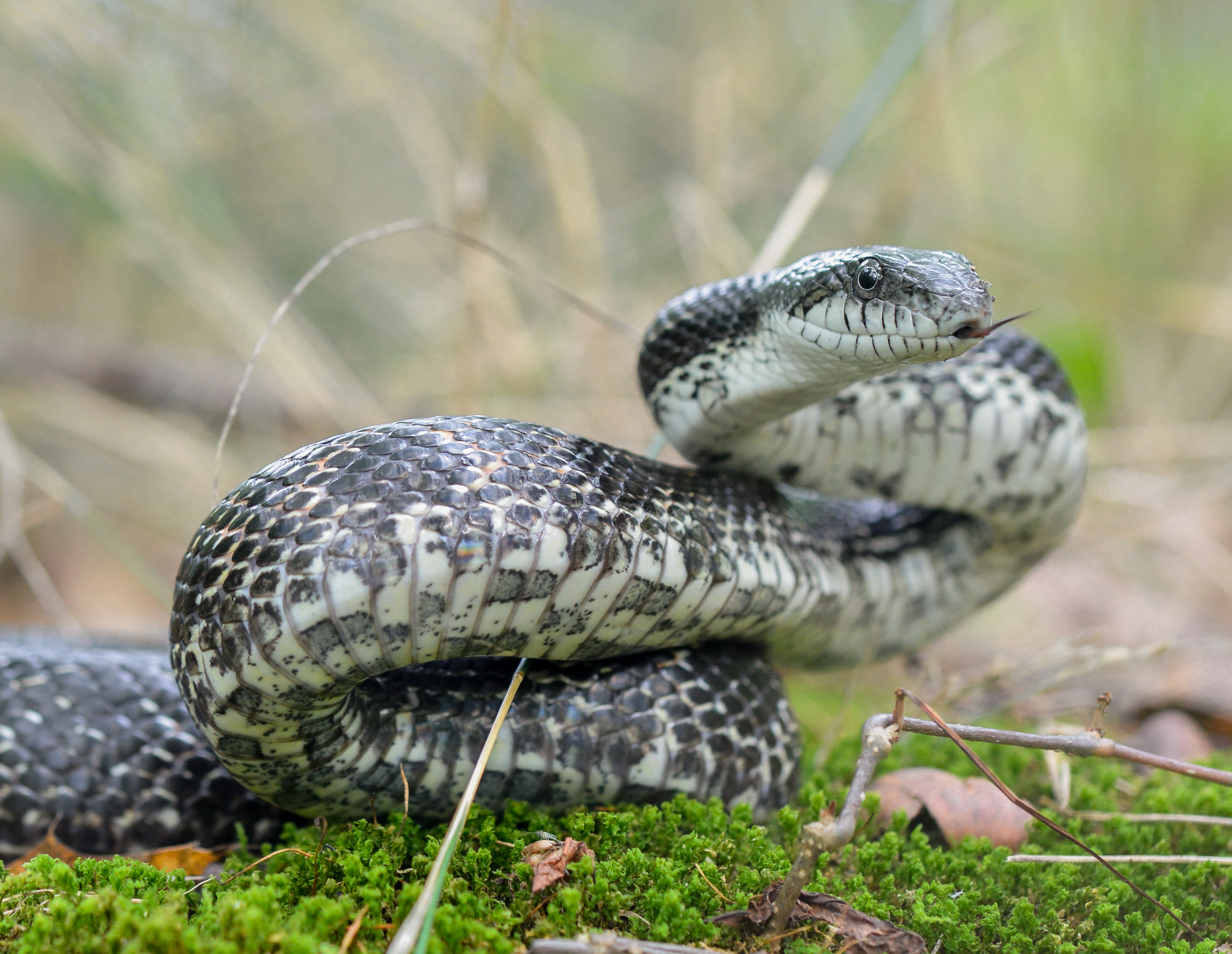

Conservation status
- Least Concern (IUCN 3.1)

Scientific classification
- Kingdom: Animalia
- Phylum: Chordata
- Class: Reptilia
- Order: Squamata
- Suborder: Serpentes
- Family: Colubridae
- Genus: Pantherophis
- Species: P. alleghaniensis

Binomial name
- Pantherophis alleghaniensis (Holbrook, 1836)

Synonyms
- Coluber alleghaniensis Holbrook, 1836; Elaphis spiloides A.M.C. Duméril, Bibron & A.H.A. Duméril, 1854; Elaphe obsoleta spiloides — Conant & Collins, 1991; Elaphe spiloides — Burbrink, 2001; Pantherophis obsoletus spiloides — D. Schmidt & Kunz, 2005; Scotophis spiloides — Collins & Taggart, 2008; Pantherophis spiloides — Pyron & Burbrink, 2009

= Central ratsnake =

Species of nonvenomous snake

The central ratsnake (Pantherophis alleghaniensis), also commonly known as the black ratsnake, chicken snake, gray ratsnake, midland ratsnake, and pilot black snake, is a species of nonvenomous snake in the subfamily Colubrinae of the family Colubridae. The gray ratsnake is one of eight species within the American ratsnake genus Pantherophis.

== Etymology ==
The generic name Pantherophis, meaning "panther-like snake", is from Ancient Greek πάνθηρ (pánthēr), meaning "panther", and ὄφις (óphis), meaning "snake".

The specific name alleghaniensis, meaning "of the Allegheny Mountains", refers to the Allegheny Mountains in eastern North America.

== Description ==
A medium to large serpent, the gray ratsnake typically reaches an adult size of 99–183 cm (3.25–6.00 ft) total length (including tail); however, the record is 213.9 cm (7.02 ft).

Unlike other Pantherophis, whose conspicuous juvenile pattern fades into adulthood, the gray ratsnake in the southern part of its range does not undergo drastic ontogenetic changes in color or markings. Instead, it retains the juvenile pattern of dark elongate dorsal blotches separated by four, or more, pale gray body scales, a light gray crown with dark striping that forms an anteriorly facing spearpoint, and a solid band which covers the eyes and extends rearward to the posterior upper labial scales.

However, in the northern part of its range it is black in adulthood, like P. quadrivittatus (yellow ratsnake) and P. obsoletus (western ratsnake). The venter is usually off-white or pale gray with darker irregular blotches, and a double row of black spots behind the divided anal plate of the vent. The dorsal scale rows around midbody are usually weakly keeled.

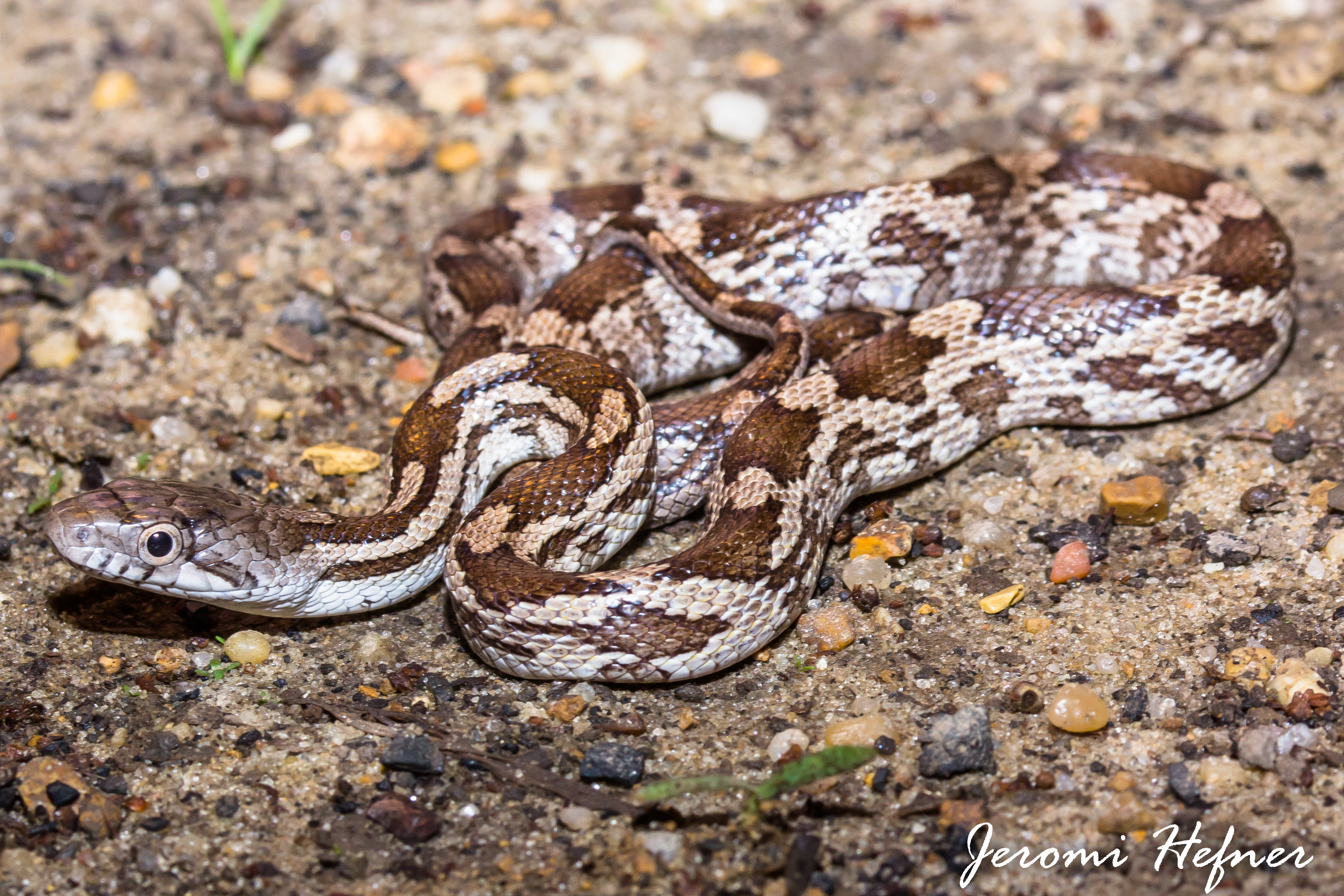
Juvenile skin pattern

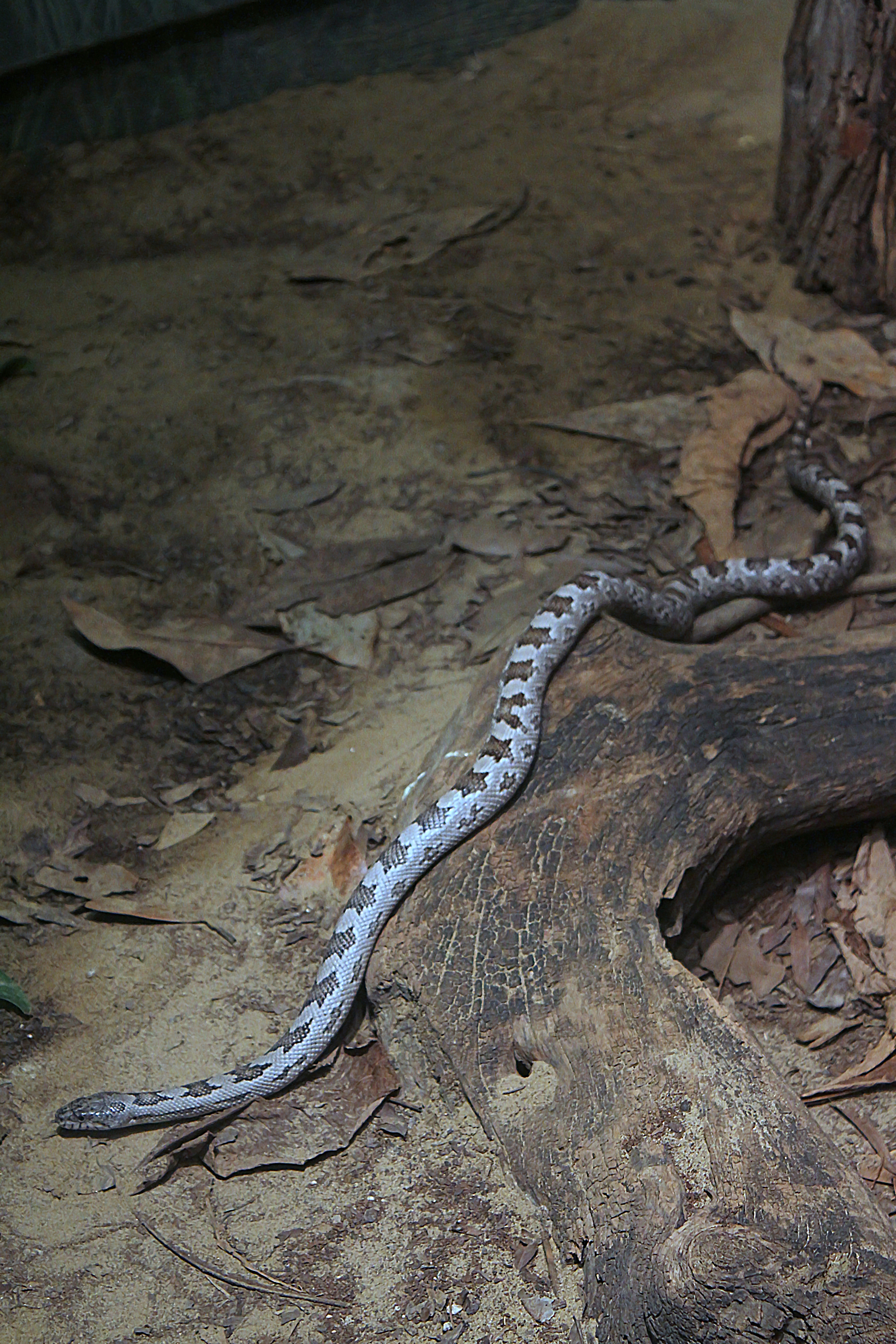
Adult

== Geographic distribution and habitat ==
Native to North America, Pantherophis alleghaniensis is commonly found in the forests of the eastern and central United States, west of the Appalachian Mountains and east of the Mississippi River. It occurs relatively continuously throughout the major part of the eastern half of the United States, along the Piedmont throughout Kentucky, from southwestern New England to the Gulf of Mexico, westward to the Mississippi River, and northward from northern Louisiana to southwestern Wisconsin.

In Canada, this species is known to occur in two disjunct regions of southern Ontario: the Carolinian forest region along the north shore of Lake Erie in the southwest, and the Great Lakes/St. Lawrence region in the southeast.

The species readily hybridizes with P. quadrivittatus in the east and P. obsoletus in the west. This hybridization creates large zones of taxonomic uncertainty, where species-level identification can be difficult.

=== Habitat ===
An agile climber, the central ratsnake is at home from the ground to the tree tops in many types of hardwood forest and cypress stands, along tree-lined streams and fields, and even around barns and sheds in close proximity to people. It will ascend trees in search of bird nests and squirrel dreys, among other arboreal prey. Within its range, almost any environment rich in rodents, and vertical escape options, proves a suitable habitat for the central ratsnake. Reproductive female ratsnakes often use water-filled tree cavities during their active seasons for gestation. Ratsnakes have a large home range that is variable in size based on habitat type and quality. They display site fidelity choosing to return to the same spots within their range over and over again to hunt. Central ratsnakes frequently live in environments that burn semi-regularly either naturally or as a management technique. The snakes typically return to the habitat within three years of a burn.

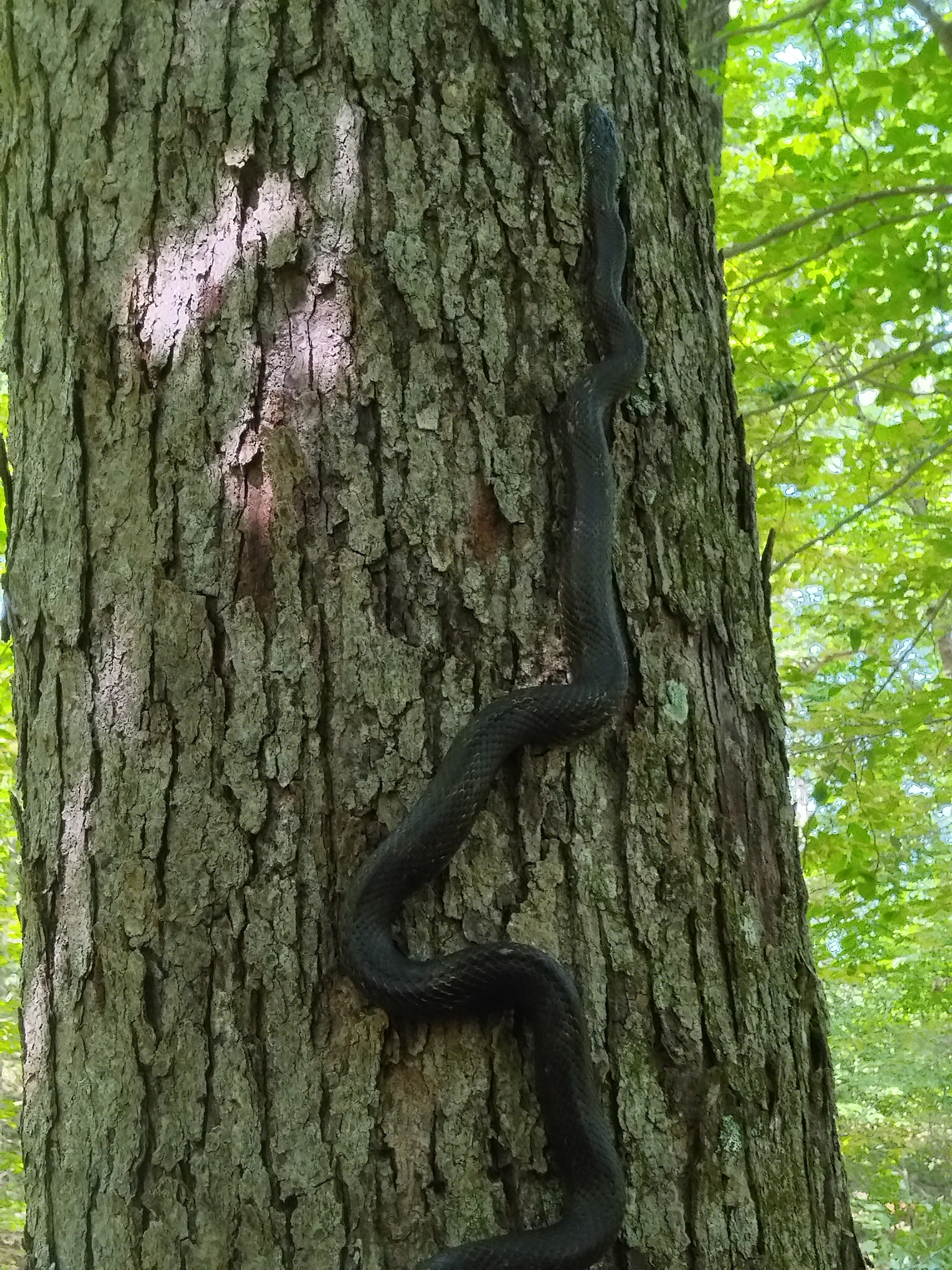
Pantherophis alleghaniensis displaying its ability to climb trees.

== Diet and behavior ==
=== Diet ===
A scent-hunter and a powerful constrictor, Pantherophis alleghaniensis feeds primarily on small mammals, birds, and bird eggs. Neonates and juveniles prefer a diet of frogs and lizards. The central ratsnake hunts using a combination of sit and wait, active pursuit, and nest predation strategies. Its active hunting style leads to a consistent high metabolic state and high average body temperature.

=== Behavior ===
When startled, the central ratsnake, like other ratsnakes, stops and remains motionless with its body held in a series of wave-like kinks. The snake will also rattle its tail against whatever it is lying on, making an audible buzzing sound; this is intended to fool a potential threat into thinking that it has encountered a rattlesnake. The central ratsnake will defend itself by raising its head and bluffing a strike. If handled, it will musk a victim by releasing the foul-smelling contents of its cloaca, and will bite if necessary. However, the central ratsnake is less likely to bite than other members of its genus, and wounds from a bite rarely require more than a small bandage. The central ratsnake is timid and avoids unnecessary conflict. Some studies suggest that the stress from capture and restraint is as physiologically demanding as intensive breeding displays. The central ratsnake is preyed upon by kingsnakes. Kingsnakes are smaller but have a stronger constriction ability than ratsnakes and are able to overpower ratsnakes.

=== Reproduction ===
Breeding in P. alleghaniensis takes place from April to July. Females reach sexual maturity at 7–9 years of age. They deposit 5 to 27 eggs around mid-summer, and the 25–30 cm (9.8–11.8 in) hatchlings usually emerge in September. Females often select high humidity, decaying log microhabitats for oviposition. Additionally, they frequently use communal nesting sites, where multiple females deposit eggs under the same log or stump.

== Conservation status ==
The central ratsnake is considered common across much of its range, but is listed as "of special concern" in Michigan and is also listed as rare in Wisconsin. The central ratsnake is listed federally in Canada as "endangered" (Carolinean population) and "threatened" (Great Lakes – St. Lawrence population). In the state of Georgia, all indigenous, nonvenomous snakes are illegal to kill or capture, and are considered to be in the custody of the Georgia Department of Natural Resources.

Habitat destruction and road mortality are leading causes of decline.
