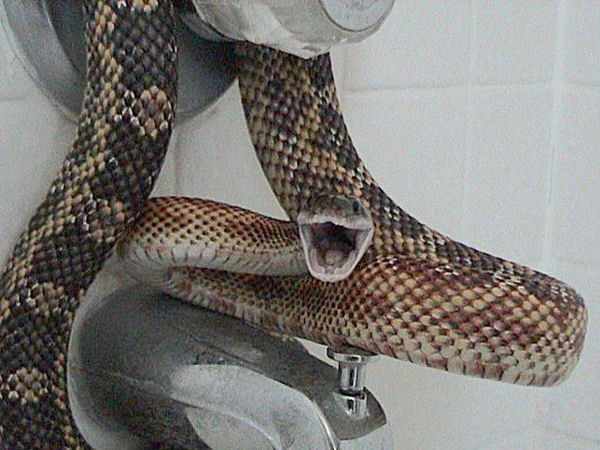

Scientific classification
- Kingdom: Animalia
- Phylum: Chordata
- Order: Squamata
- Suborder: Serpentes
- Family: Colubridae
- Genus: Pantherophis
- Species: P. obsoletus
- Subspecies: P. o. lindheimeri

Trinomial name
- Pantherophis obsoletus lindheimeri (Baird & Girard, 1853)

Synonyms
- Scotophis lindheimerii Baird & Girard, 1853

= Texas rat snake =

Subspecies of snake

The Texas rat snake (Pantherophis obsoletus lindheimeri) is a subspecies of the western rat snake, a nonvenomous colubrid. It is found in the United States, primarily within the state of Texas, but its range extends into Louisiana, Arkansas and Oklahoma. It intergrades with other subspecies of Elaphe obsoleta, so exact range boundaries are impossible to distinguish. The epithet lindheimeri is to honor the German-American naturalist Ferdinand Jacob Lindheimer, who collected the first specimen in New Braunfels, Texas.

== Description ==
The Texas rat snake is a medium to large snake, capable of attaining lengths of 4–5 ft. They vary greatly in color and patterning throughout their range, but they are typically yellow or tan, with brown to olive-green, irregular blotching from head to tail. Specimens from the southern area of their range tend to have more yellow, while those from the northern range tend to be darker. One way to distinguish them from other rat snakes is they are the only ones with a solid grey head. Some specimens have red or orange speckling. The belly is typically a solid gray or white in color. The several naturally occurring color variations include albinos, high orange or hypomelanistic, and a few specimens which display leucism, which have become regularly captive-bred and are popular in the pet trade. The Texas rat snake becomes very black with white spots in some specimens caught in Sabine County, Texas, which reflects the northern intergrade of the black rat snake.

== Behavior ==
Texas rat snakes are relatively timid for such a large snake, but they are extremely variable in temperament. Adults can be mild-tempered – exhibiting mouth gaping and biting when approached. Juveniles less than a year old may either be very docile or bite when disturbed. One of their defensive behaviors involves 'rattling' or rapidly whipping the end of their tails back and forth against anything nearby to create a rattling sound. They also have an awful-smelling musk compared to other snakes. They eat readily in captivity and will eat thawed frozen mice and rats. Wild-caught specimens generally eventually become docile in captivity.

== Diet ==
The Texas rat snake has a voracious appetite, consuming large numbers of rodents and birds, and sometimes lizards, soft-bodied insects, and frogs, which they subdue with constriction. They are generalists, found in a wide range of habitats from swamps to forests to grasslands, even in urban areas. They are agile climbers, able to reach bird nests with relative ease. They are often found around farmland, and sometimes consume fledgling chickens and eggs, which leads them to be erroneously called the chicken snake.

== Taxonomy ==
All North American rat snake species have been suggested for reclassification to the genus Pantherophis. A further revision of Pantherophis obsoletus has recommended the elimination of the various subspecies entirely, considering them all to be merely locality variations. However, the ICZN has rejected the renaming, thus Elaphe remains the generally accepted generic name.

== Gallery ==
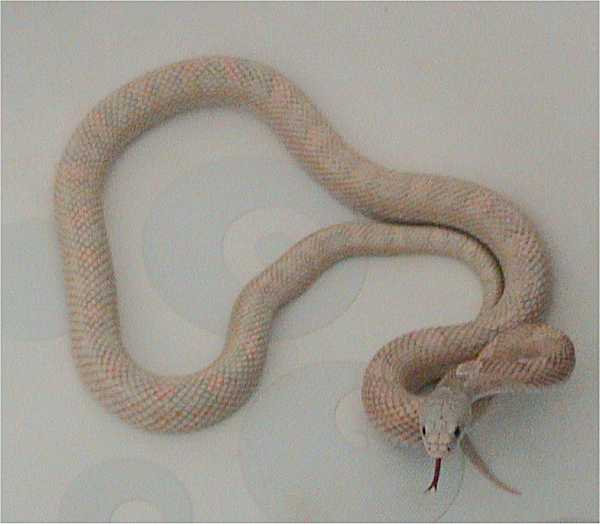
Leucistic Texas rat snake

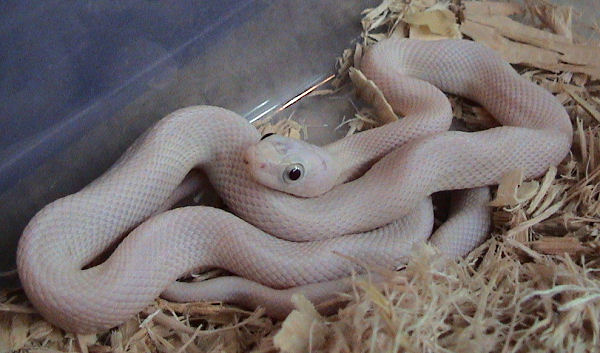
Leucistic Texas rat snake

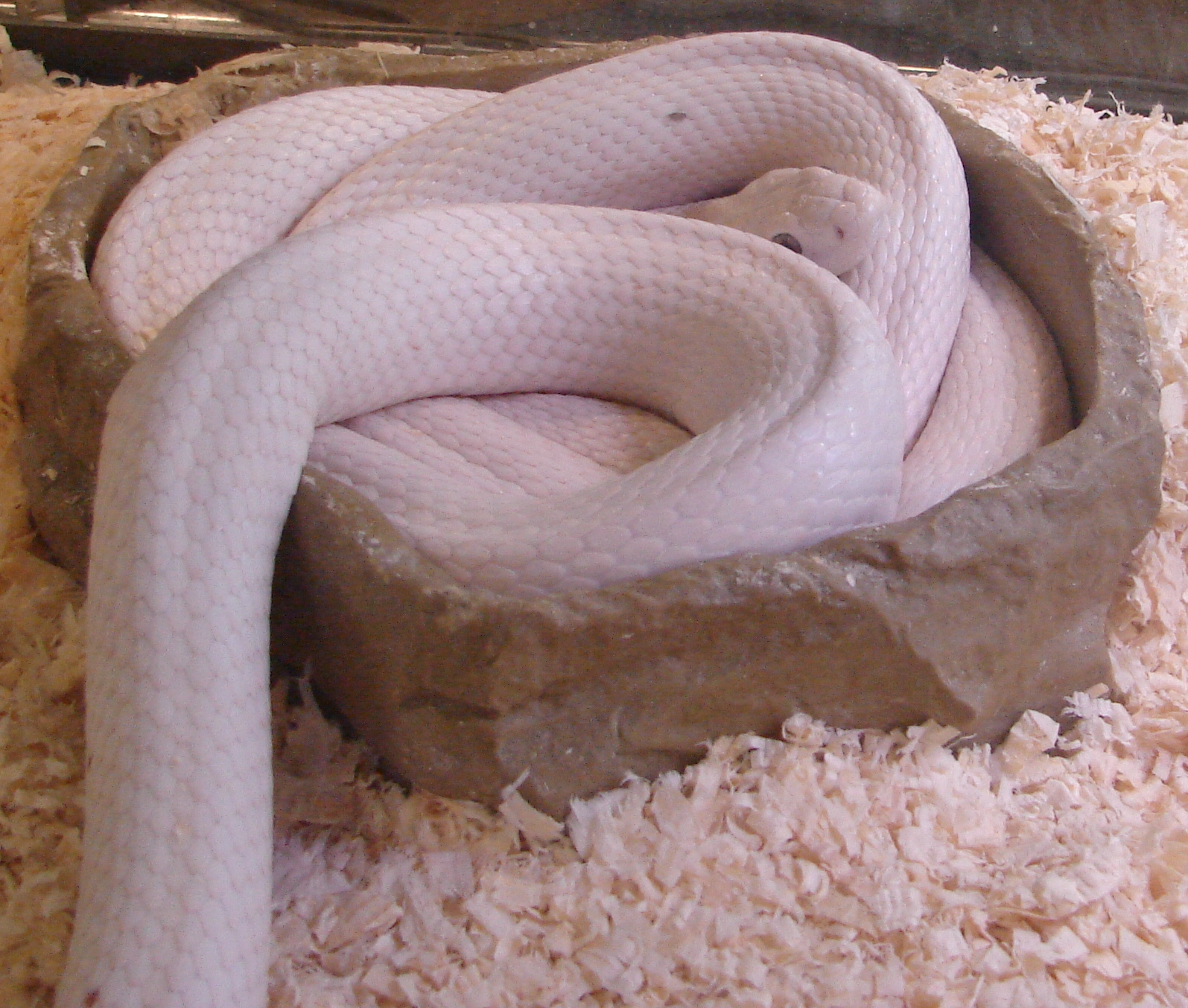
Leucistic Texas rat snake at The Reptile Zoo east of Monroe, Washington
