= Pilot snake =

Pilot snake may refer to:

- Pantherophis alleghaniensis, pilot snake or pilot black snake
- Pituophis melanoleucus, or pilot snake
- Pantherophis bairdi, Baird's pilot snake
- Pantherophis emoryi, Emory's pilot snake
- Pantherophis obsoletus, pilot black snake
