= Slowinski's corn snake =

Slowinski's rat snake

Conservation status
- Data Deficient (IUCN 3.1)

Scientific classification
- Kingdom: Animalia
- Phylum: Chordata
- Class: Reptilia
- Order: Squamata
- Suborder: Serpentes
- Family: Colubridae
- Genus: Pantherophis
- Species: P. emoryi
- Subspecies: P. e. slowinskii

Trinomial name
- Pantherophis emoryi slowinskii (Burbrink, 2002)

Synonyms
- Elaphe slowinskii Burbrink, 2002; Pantherophis slowinskii — Jiang et al., 2007

Subspecies of snake

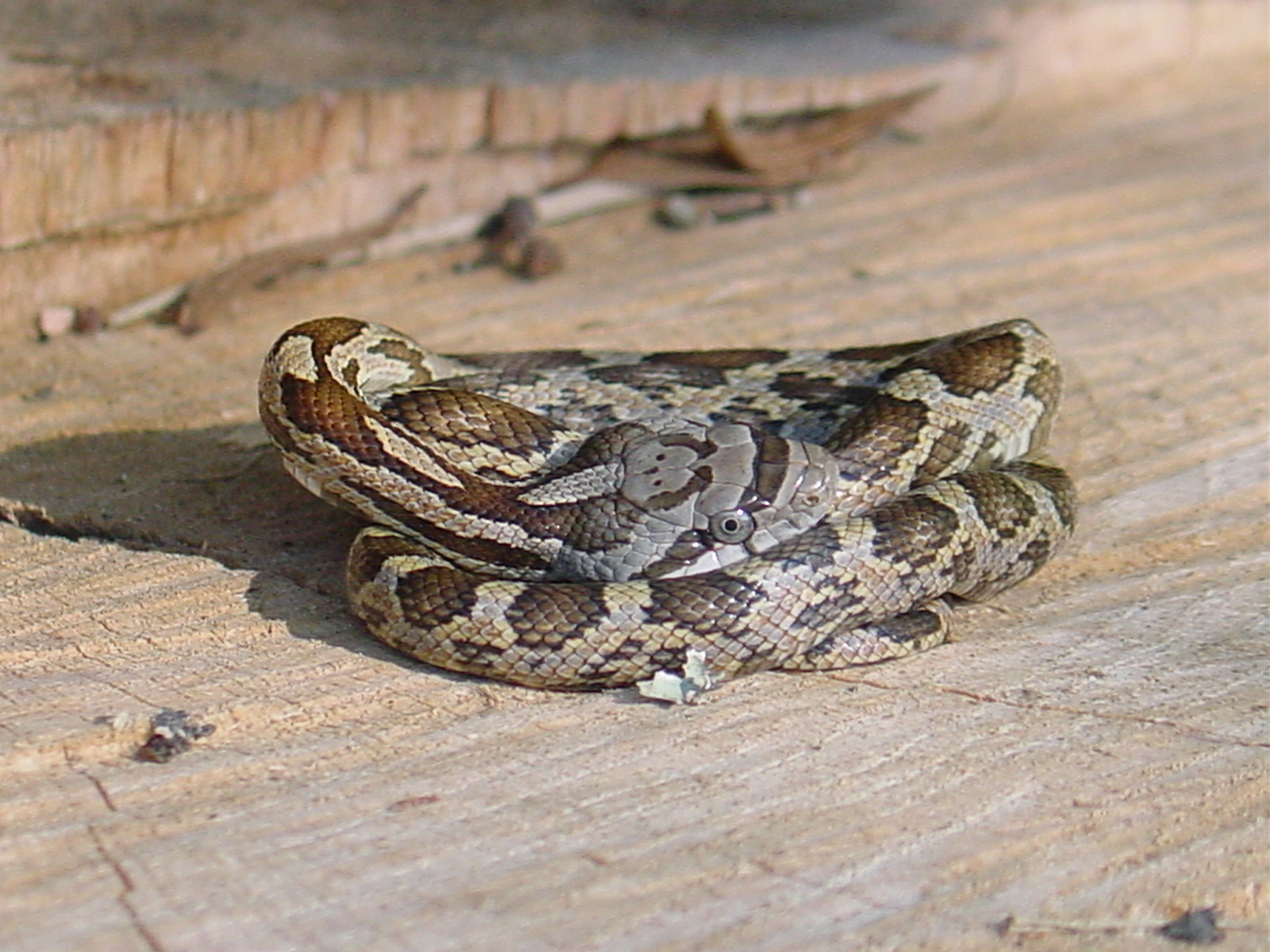
Slowinski's Corn Snake warming itself on oak tree stump in Oberlin, Louisiana.

Slowinski's corn snake (Pantherophis emoryi slowinskii) is a subspecies of nonvenomous snake in the family Colubridae. The subspecies is indigenous to Louisiana, eastern Texas, and Arkansas.

== Classification ==
Pantherophis emoryi slowinskii has long been considered an intergrade of the corn snake (Pantherophis guttata) and the Great Plains rat snake (Pantherophis emoryi). In 2002 it was proposed to be elevated to species status with the name Pantherophis slowinskii in honor the memory of American herpetologist Joseph Bruno Slowinski. However, the reclassification has not been widely recognized; as of May 2024, the Reptile Database continues to consider it a subspecies.

The variations are probably best identified in Arkansas by simply consulting a range map, given that their ranges in the state do not overlap.

== Description ==
Slowinski's corn snake is medium-sized and colored grayish-brown, with a series of large, alternating, chocolate-brown blotches. These blotches are often bordered in black. It has a spearhead marking on the head. The belly is checkered black and white, giving it an appearance of maize (its close relative, the corn snake, is believed to have gotten its name for this belly pattern).

While this subspecies resembles superficially the prairie kingsnake (Lampropeltis calligaster), the spearhead marking present on the head of Slowinski's corn snake is usually sufficient for identification. Its body has a rounded top, steep sides, and a flat belly.

The young of this subspecies can be distinguished from those of the western rat snake (Pantherophis obsoletus) by considering the dark bar that runs through each eye. In Slowinski's corn snake, this bar extends through the jawline and onto the neck, whereas in the western rat snake the bar extends only to the jawline where it stops abruptly.

== Behavior ==
This subspecies, Pantherophis emoryi slowinskii, is nocturnal and quite secretive. Like its sister-species, the Great Plains rat snake (Pantherophis emoryi), it is an excellent climber and likely spends a large portion of its time up in trees. These habits together may explain why it is so infrequently encountered by humans. Its nocturnal tendencies may also help it avoid dangers, such as day-foraging hawks.

Slowinski's corn snake is likely similar in temperament to its sister-species, the Great Plains rat snake, which is very tame. Slowinski's corn snake relies mainly on camouflage for defense and rarely bites.

This species feeds primarily on small mammals and birds. Prey, when caught, is constricted and consumed. Presumably, it follows an activity pattern similar to other rat snakes: hibernate through winter, breed in the spring, and lay eggs in the summer.

== Distribution and abundance ==
The abundance of the species P. emoryi slowinskii is largely unknown. The lack of voucher specimens from Arkansas seems to indicate that it is extremely rare in that state, being known only from isolated localities in the southeastern part. Trauth et al. indicate only a single locality in the state, Drew County.

== Bibliography ==
- Behler JL, King FW (1987). The Audubon Society Field Guide to North American Reptiles and Amphibians. 3rd ed. New York: Alfred A. Knopf. 743 pp.
- Conant R, Collins JT (1998). A Field Guide to Reptiles and Amphibians of Eastern and Central North America. 3rd ed., Expanded. Boston: Houghton Mifflin Co. 616 pp.
- Irwin KJ (2004). Arkansas Snake Guide. Little Rock: Arkansas Game and Fish Commission. 50 pp.
- Jiang, Zhi J; Castoe, Todd A; Austin, Christopher C; Burbrink, Frank T; Herron, Matthew D; McGuire, Jimmy A; Parkinson, Christopher L; Pollock, David D (2007). "Comparative mitochondrial genomics of snakes: extraordinary substitution rate dynamics and functionality of the duplicate control region". BMC Evolutionary Biology. 7 (1): 123. Bibcode:2007BMCEE...7..123J. doi:10.1186/1471-2148-7-123. ISSN 1471-2148. PMC 1950710. PMID 17655768. (Pantherophis slowinskii, new combination).
- Trauth SE, Robison HW, Plummer MV (2004). Amphibians and Reptiles of Arkansas. Fayetteville: University of Arkansas Press. 421 pp. ISBN 1557287384.
