= Fox snake =

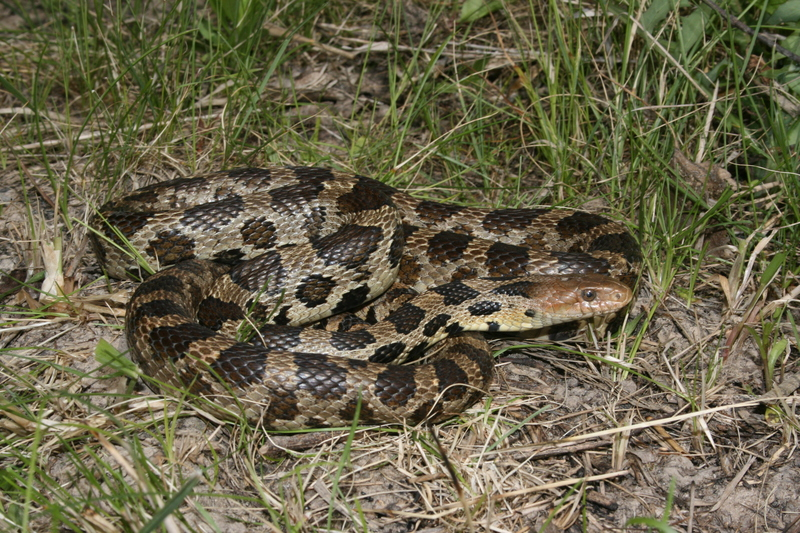
A western fox snake (Panthrophis vulpinus) from Iowa

Fox snake or foxsnake is the common name given to some North American rat snakes of the genus Pantherophis. It is generally agreed that there are two such species, but three candidate species names have arisen for them:

- Pantherophis gloydi (eastern fox snake), originally described by Conant in 1940, merged with P. vulpinus in 2011
- Pantherophis vulpinus (foxsnake or western fox snake or eastern fox snake), originally described by Baird & Girard in 1853
- Pantherophis ramspotti (western fox snake), originally described by Crother, White, Savage, Eckstut, Graham & Gardner in 2011
