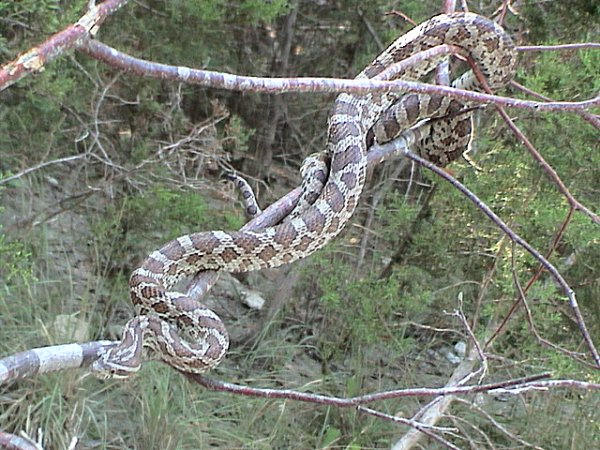

Conservation status
- Least Concern (IUCN 3.1)

- Secure (NatureServe)

Scientific classification
- Kingdom: Animalia
- Phylum: Chordata
- Class: Reptilia
- Order: Squamata
- Suborder: Serpentes
- Family: Colubridae
- Genus: Pantherophis
- Species: P. emoryi

Binomial name
- Pantherophis emoryi (Baird & Girard, 1853)

Synonyms
- Scotophis emoryi Baird & Girard, 1853; Scotophis calligaster Kennicott, 1859; Coluber rhinomegas Cope, 1860; Coluber laetus — Boulenger, 1894; Elaphe laeta intermontanus Woodbury & Woodbury, 1942; Elaphe quivira Burt, 1946; Elaphe guttata emoryi — Stebbins, 1985; Elaphe emoryi — Vaughan et al., 1996; Pantherophis emoryi — Potts & Collins, 2005

= Pantherophis emoryi =

Species of snake

Pantherophis emoryi, commonly known as the Great Plains rat snake, is a species of non-venomous rat snake in the family Colubridae. The species is native to the central part of the United States, from Missouri to Nebraska, to Colorado, south to Texas, and into northern Mexico.

== Etymology ==
The epithet, emoryi, is in honor of Brigadier General William Hemsley Emory, who was chief surveyor of the U.S. Boundary Survey team of 1852 and collected specimens for the Smithsonian Institution. As such, it is sometimes referred to as Emory's rat snake.

== Common names ==
Additional common names for Pantherophis emoryi include the following: brown rat snake, chicken snake, eastern spotted snake, Emory's Coluber, Emory's pilot snake, Emory's racer, Emory's snake, gray rat snake, mouse snake, prairie rat snake, spotted mouse snake, Texas rat snake, and western pilot snake.

== Description ==
The Great Plains rat snake is typically light gray or tan in color, with dark gray, brown, or green-gray blotching down its back, and stripes on either side of the head which meet to form a point between the eyes. It is capable of growing to 3–5 feet (0.91–1.52 m) in total length (including tail).

== Habitat and behavior ==
The Great Plains rat snake prefers open grassland or lightly forested habitats, but is also found on coastal plains, semi-arid regions, as well as rocky, moderately mountainous regions. It can often be found on farmland, which often leads to its being erroneously called a chicken snake, and other areas with a relatively high rodent population, which is its primary diet. It will also eat birds, and occasionally snakes, lizards and frogs, all of which it subdues by constriction. It is primarily nocturnal, and oviparous, laying clutches of as many as 25 eggs in the late spring. Like most rat snakes, when agitated, the Great Plains rat snake will shake its tail vigorously, which by itself makes no noise, but when it shakes among dry leaf litter, it can sound remarkably like a rattlesnake, and often leads to misidentification. The Great Plains rat snake tends to remain still for a majority of its time awake, which is odd for a nocturnal being. On average, the Great Plains rat snake only moves 188 m (617 ft) per day. The yellow-bellied racer (Coluber constrictor flaviventris), a snake that often lives in the same habitat, moves more often than the Great Plains rat snake, which could lead to a decline in the Great Plains rat snake's population as it is not as mobile.

Warning signs of agitation are curling up tightly and shaking its tail rapidly. Though P. emoryi has very small teeth and is nonvenomous, it will bite. However, as a whole, this species of snake is very calm and non-aggressive.

== Taxonomy ==
This species, Pantherophis emoryi, has undergone extensive reclassification since it was first described by Spencer Fullerton Baird and Charles Frédéric Girard in 1853 as Scotophis emoryi. It has often been placed in the genus Elaphe, but phylogenetic analyses performed in the 2000s have resulted in its transfer to Pantherophis.

P. emoryi has been elevated to full species status and downgraded to a subspecies of P. guttatus multiple times. Most recently, Burbrink suggested that P. guttatus be split into three species: P. guttatus, P. emoryi, and P. slowinskii.

The most recent taxonomic paper on this species complex refutes Burbrink's species suggestions based on more comprehensive sampling and genetic work. "Our data support a revision of the taxonomy of this group, and we recognize two species within the complex and three subspecies within P. emoryi. This study illustrates the importance of thorough sampling of contact zones and consideration of gene flow when delimiting species in widespread complexes containing parapatric lineages."
