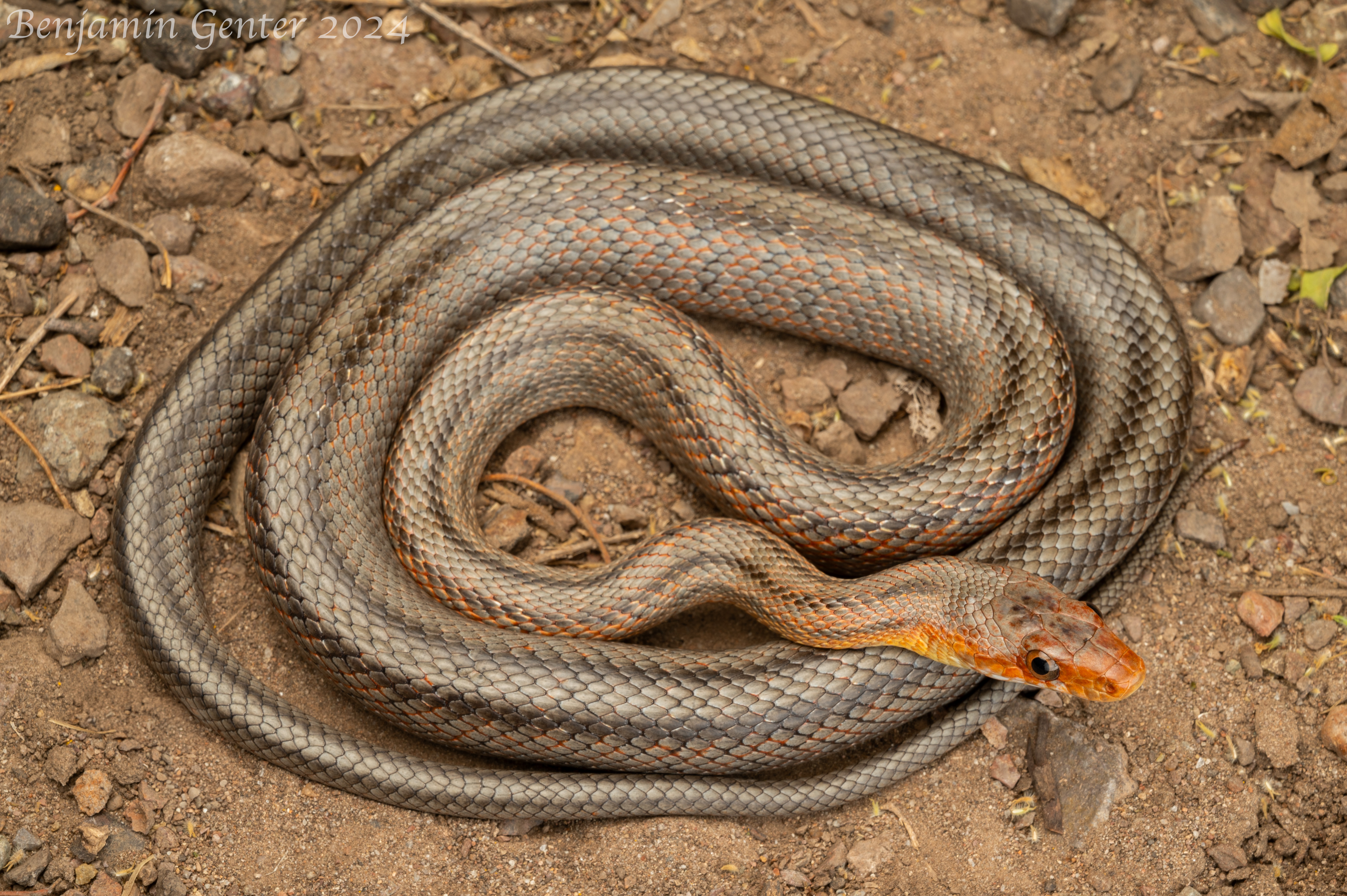

Conservation status
- Least Concern (IUCN 3.1)

- Apparently Secure (NatureServe)

Scientific classification
- Kingdom: Animalia
- Phylum: Chordata
- Class: Reptilia
- Order: Squamata
- Suborder: Serpentes
- Family: Colubridae
- Genus: Pantherophis
- Species: P. bairdi

Binomial name
- Pantherophis bairdi (Yarrow, 1880)

Synonyms
- Coluber bairdi Yarrow, 1880; Elaphe obsoleta bairdi — Dowling, 1952; Elaphe bairdi — Conant & Collins, 1991; Pantherophis bairdi — Utiger et al., 2002; Pituophis bairdi — Burbrink, 2007; Scotophis bairdi — Collins & Taggart, 2008; Pantherophis bairdi — Pyron & Burbrink, 2009

= Pantherophis bairdi =

Species of snake

Pantherophis bairdi is a species of harmless snake in the family Colubridae. The species is native to the southwestern United States and adjacent northeastern Mexico. No subspecies are recognized as being valid.

== Geographic range and habitat ==
P. bairdi is found in the United States in the Big Bend region of western Texas, as well as in northern Mexico in the Mexican states of Coahuila, Nuevo León, and Tamaulipas. It is known to be elusive and hard to find in the wild.

P. bairdi prefers semi-arid, rocky habitats.

== Etymology and common names ==
The specific name, bairdi, as well as several of the common names, are in honor of American zoologist Spencer Fullerton Baird.

Common names include: Baird's rat snake, Baird's ratsnake, Baird's pilot snake, Baird's Coluber, and Great Bend rat snake.

== Description ==
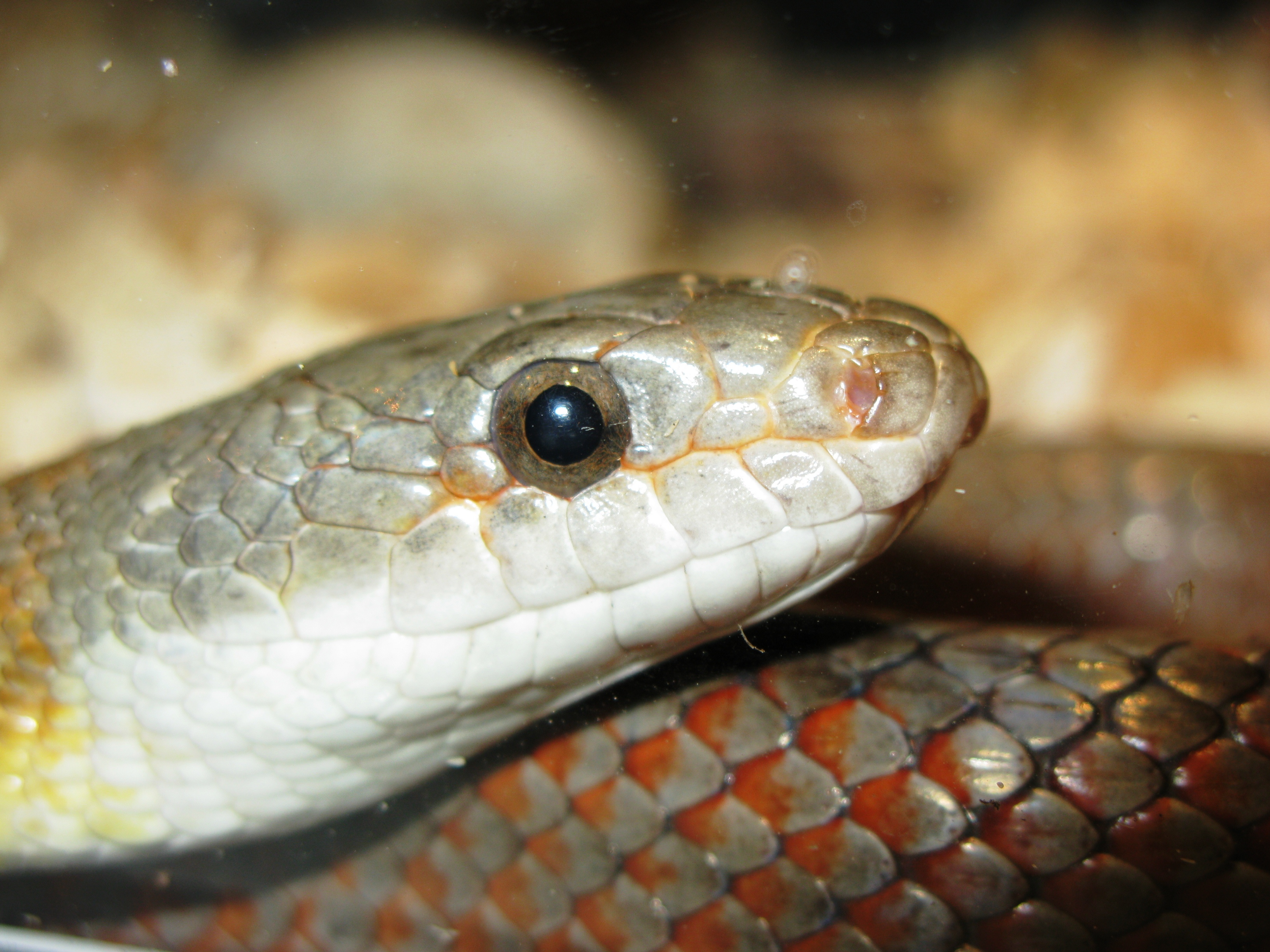
Head

Adults of P. bairdi may reach 64 to 140 cm (25 to 55 in) in total length (including tail). The dorsal color pattern consists of an orange-yellow to bright yellow, or a darker salmon ground color, overlaid with four stripes that run from the neck to the tail. The belly is generally gray to yellow, darkening near the tail.

== Biology ==
The primary diet of P. bairdi consists of rodents, although it will also prey on birds. Juveniles often eat lizards.

Baird's rat snake is typically more pleasantly tempered than other rat snake species.

P. bairdi is oviparous. Adult females may lay a clutch of up to 10 eggs that take about 3 months to hatch.

== Taxonomy ==
P. bairdi has sometimes been considered a subspecies of P. obsoletus, to which it is closely related. P. bairdi was for a long time placed in the genus Elaphe, but phylogenetic analyses by Utiger et al. in 2002 resulted in its transfer to the genus Pantherophis.
