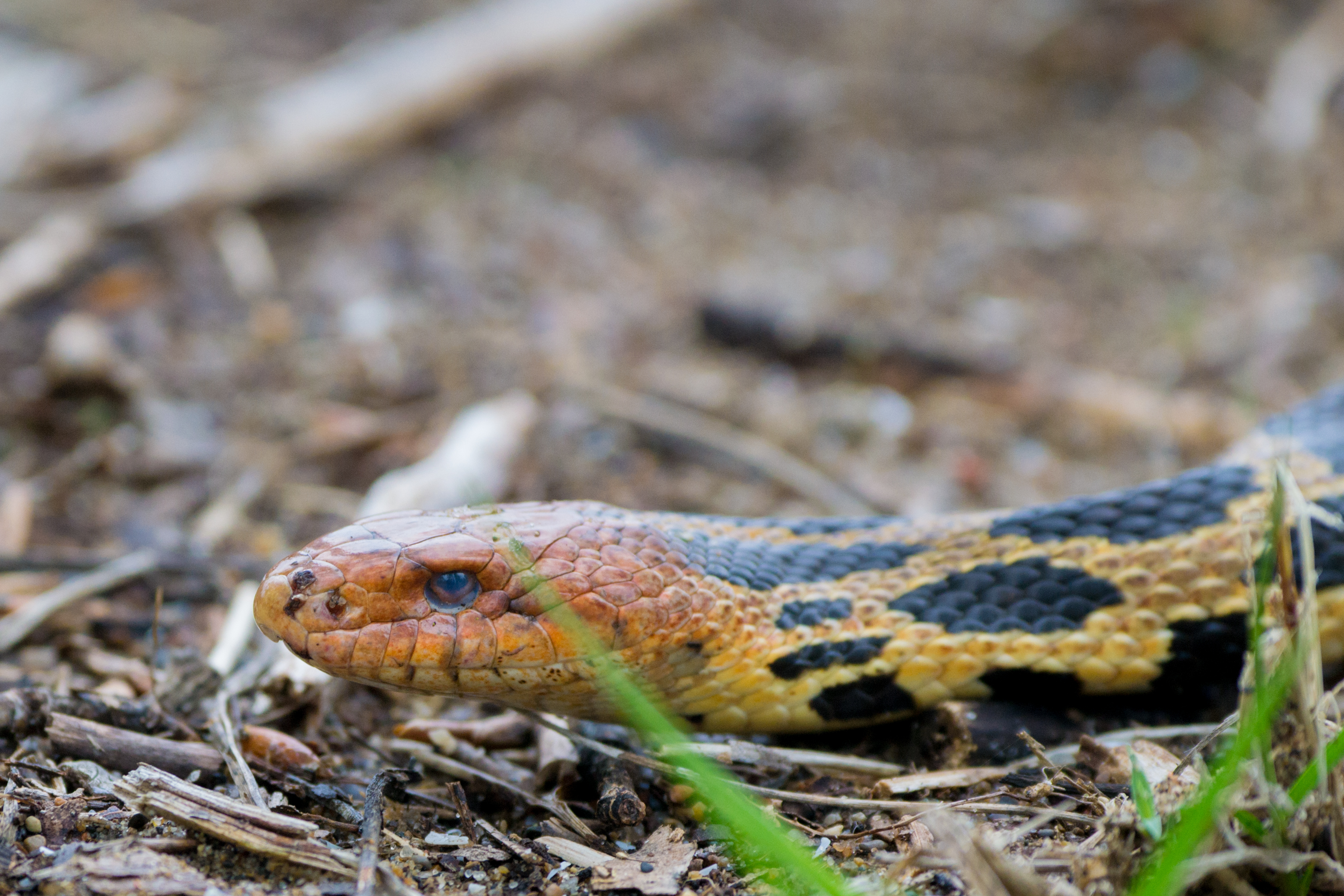

Conservation status
- Least Concern (IUCN 3.1)

- Secure (NatureServe)

Scientific classification
- Kingdom: Animalia
- Phylum: Chordata
- Class: Reptilia
- Order: Squamata
- Suborder: Serpentes
- Family: Colubridae
- Genus: Pantherophis
- Species: P. vulpinus

Binomial name
- Pantherophis vulpinus (Baird & Girard, 1853)

Synonyms
- Scotophis vulpinus Baird & Girard, 1853; Elaphis rubriceps A.M.C. Duméril, Bibron & A.H.A. Duméril, 1854; Coluber vulpinus — Boulenger, 1894; Elaphe vulpina — Conant & Collins, 1991; Elaphe gloydi — Collins, 1991; Mintonius vulpina — Saviola et al., 2012; Pantherophis vulpinus — Crother et al., 2011; Pantherophis gloydi — Conant, 1940

= Pantherophis vulpinus =

Species of snake

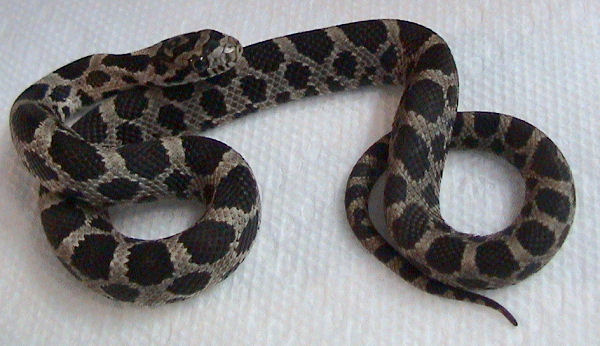
Pantherophis vulpinusvar gloydi

Pantherophis vulpinus, commonly known as the foxsnake or the eastern fox snake, is a species of nonvenomous rat snake in the family Colubridae. The species is native to North America.

== Taxonomy ==
Between about 1990 and 2011, foxsnakes were sometimes divided into two species, with P. vulpinus as the western foxsnake, and P. gloydi as the eastern foxsnake. A 2011 paper by Crother, White, Savage, Eckstut, Graham and Gardner proposed instead that the Mississippi River be established as the species boundary between two species of foxsnakes, and that those found to its east be considered P. vulpinus (including those previously known as P. gloydi) and those found to its west be given the new name P. ramspotti. This proposed that P. vulpinus, which had been known as the western foxsnake, become known as the eastern foxsnake, and the new P. ramspotti become known as the western foxsnake. Thus, P. vulpinus is sometimes called the western foxsnake and sometimes called the eastern foxsnake.

== Etymology ==
The specific name, vulpinus, (meaning "fox-like") is in honor of Rev. Charles Fox (1815–1854), collector of the holotype, an academic play on words.

The specific name for the junior synonym gloydi is in honor of American herpetologist Howard K. Gloyd.

== Common names ==
Other common names for P. vulpinus include eastern foxsnake, foxsnake, and fox snake.

== Description ==
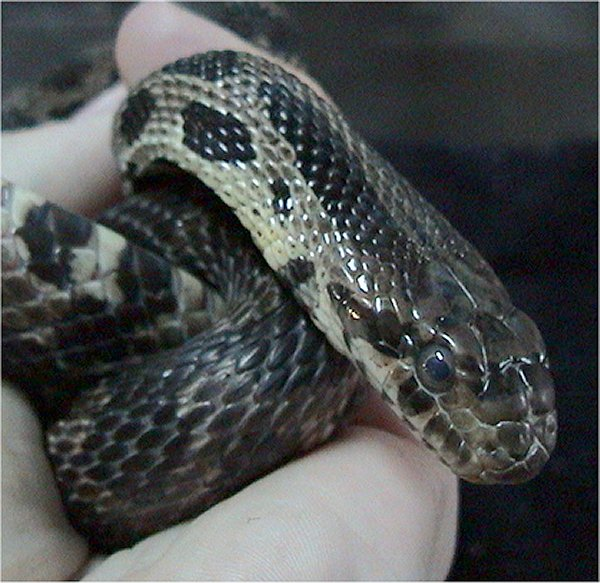
Closeup of head.

Adult eastern foxsnakes are 3 to 6 feet (0.91 to 1.83 m) in total length (including tail) and have a short, flattened snout. Dorsally, they are usually light golden brown with dark brown spots and they have a yellow checkerboard pattern on the belly.

Like most North American snakes, foxsnakes are not venomous. Foxsnakes earned their name because the musk they give off when threatened smells similar to a fox.

== Geographic range ==
P. vulpinus is found in the upper midwestern United States east of the Mississippi River.

The geographic range of the closely related western fox snake (Pantherophis ramspotti) is west of the Mississippi River. Although the two species do overlap along the eastern side of the Mississippi River, there is no intergrade zone.

P. v. gloydi is found in the eastern Great Lakes region. Both P. v. gloydi and P. v. vulpinus live in the state of Michigan. P. v. vulpinus lives in the Upper Peninsula of Michigan, where it is sometimes known as the pine snake, and P. v. gloydi lives in the Lower Peninsula of Michigan. P. v. gloydi can also be found in Ohio in the United States, and in Western Ontario in Canada.

== Habitat ==
The preferred natural habitats of P. vulpinus are varied, including open woodland, prairie, farmland, pastures, and marshlands.

== Behavior ==
Strong and agile, fox snakes are excellent climbers, but are more often found on the ground. Fox snakes are diurnal, but may hunt at night during the hot summer months. Like all snakes, fox snakes are cold-blooded and cannot adjust their own body temperature; so these snakes often hide in burrows or under logs or rocks to stay safe from extremely hot or cold weather. In winter, they brumate underground, where they can avoid freezing temperatures.

These docile, harmless snakes use several defensive behaviors against predators. They may shake their tails in dry leaves, sounding like rattlesnakes. They can also give off a stinky musk from glands near their tail, which makes them less appetizing to other animals. This musk has an odor similar to that of the red fox; this is the origin of the common name "fox snake". As a last resort, these snakes may hiss loudly and strike at the threat.

== Life history ==
Foxsnakes mate in April and May. Males wrestle with one another for the right to mate with females. In June, July or August, the female will bury a clutch of seven to 27 eggs under a log or in debris on the forest floor. These hatch after an approximately 60 day incubation period. Young fox snakes are usually much lighter in color than adults.

Like all reptiles, P. vulpinus reproduces sexually and is an r-strategists according to r/K selection theory. An adult female may lay between 7 and 29 eggs, which generally hatch after about 60 days. Eggs are usually laid under logs, or in rotting wood or humus.

Foxsnakes are strict carnivores. They are often a welcome sight around farmlands, where they consume a large number of rodents that can otherwise be harmful to crops, or transmit parasites to captive animal stocks, though they are opportunistic feeders and will sometimes also eat fledgling chickens or eggs, which sometimes leads them to be erroneously called the chicken snake. Their primary diet consists of mice and other small rodents, but they will take any prey small enough to swallow whole, including young rabbits, frogs, fledgling birds and eggs. As constrictors, they subdue their prey by squeezing it between their coils.

== Conservation status ==
The eastern foxsnake is listed as "Least Concern" on the IUCN Red List of Threatened and Endangered Species, and it is not listed on CITES. While this snake is common within its range, many states have protected it, primarily to prevent over-collection for the pet trade.

P. vulpinus is considered threatened over most of its range due to habitat loss. Numbers have plummeted because of the development of wetlands and coastal habitat. Its numbers have also fallen due to collection for the pet trade. P. vulpinus is often misidentified as the copperhead, Agkistrodon contortrix or as the massasauga, Sistrurus catenatus. P. vulpinus often rattles its tail similar to rattlesnakes as a form of mimicry. This behavior also contributes to its decline in numbers, as many people fear that the snake may be venomous. In Ohio, P. gloydi is listed as a "Species of Concern" by the Ohio Division of Wildlife. In Michigan it is listed as a "Threatened Species" by the DNR and is protected by state law. In Ontario the species is listed as "Threatened Provincially and Nationally".

== See also ==
- Pantherophis ramspotti – the western fox snake (split from P. vulpinus in 2011)
