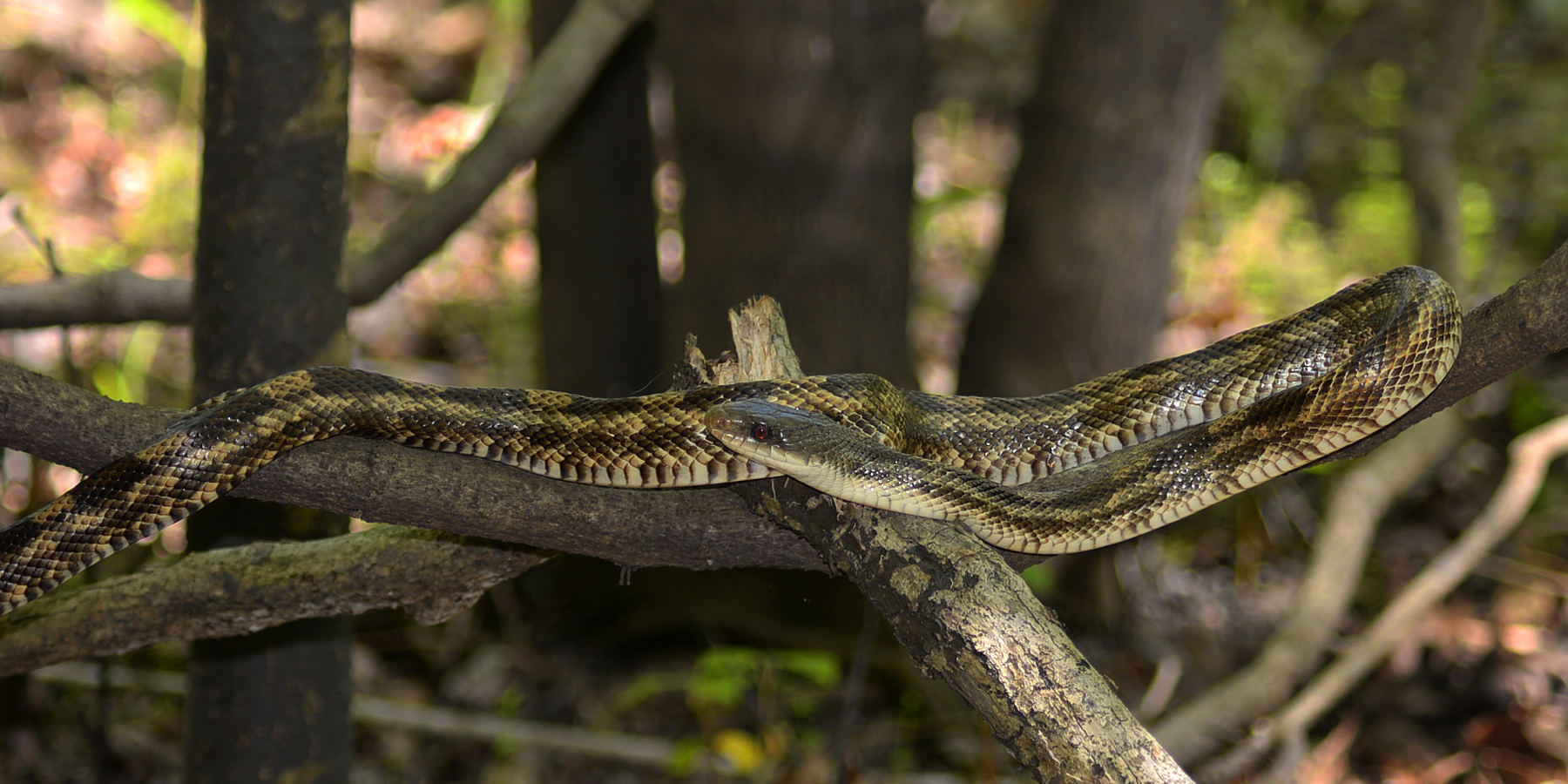
- Western ratsnake, Liberty County, Texas

Conservation status
- Secure (NatureServe)

- Least Concern (IUCN 3.1)

Scientific classification
- Kingdom: Animalia
- Phylum: Chordata
- Class: Reptilia
- Order: Squamata
- Suborder: Serpentes
- Family: Colubridae
- Genus: Pantherophis
- Species: P. obsoletus

Binomial name
- Pantherophis obsoletus (Say in James, 1823)

Synonyms
- Coluber obsoletus Say, 1823; Elaphis holbrookii A.M.C. Dumeril & Bibron, 1854; Scotophis obsoletus — Kennicott, 1860; Elaphis obsoletus — Garman, 1883; Elaphe obsoleta — Stejneger & Barbour, 1917; Pantherophis obsoletus — Utiger et al., 2002; Pituophis obsoletus — Burbrink & Lawson, 2007; Scotophis obsoletus — Collins & Taggart, 2008; Pantherophis obsoletus — Pyron & Burbrink, 2009

= Pantherophis obsoletus =

Species of snake

Pantherophis obsoletus, also known commonly as the western rat snake, black rat snake (not to be confused with Pantherophis alleghaniensis), pilot black snake, or simply black snake, is a nonvenomous species of snake in the family Colubridae. The species is native to central North America west of the Mississippi River. No subspecies are recognized as being valid. Its color variations include the Texas rat snake. Along with other snakes of the eastern United States, like the eastern indigo snake (Drymarchon couperi) and the eastern racer (Coluber constrictor), it is called "black snake".

== Geographic range ==
Pantherophis obsoletus is found west of the Mississippi River, from eastern and southern Iowa southward through Missouri and Arkansas to western Louisiana, westward to eastern Texas, northward through Oklahoma and eastern Kansas to southeastern Nebraska.

Aside from the usual variety that is black or has patches of black on a lighter background, color variations include the Texas rat snake, which is a brown-to-black variant, often with tinges of orange or red, that can be found in southern Oklahoma, Texas, and Louisiana.

== Habitat ==
Rat snakes of the genus Pantherophis are primarily diurnally active and live in a variety of habitats; some overlap each other. They have adapted to a variety of habitats, including bayou, prairie, and rock outcrops, but they seem to have a particular preference for wooded areas, especially oak trees. They can also adjust their waking schedules in different habitats and exhibit facultative nocturnal behaviors. These rat snakes are excellent climbers and spend a significant amount of their time in trees. The black rat snake is also a competent swimmer.

During winter, they hibernate in shared dens, often with copperheads and timber rattlesnakes. When found in homes, they are often in groups. This association gave rise to one of its common names, pilot black snake, and the superstition that this nonvenomous species led the venomous ones to the den.

== Description ==
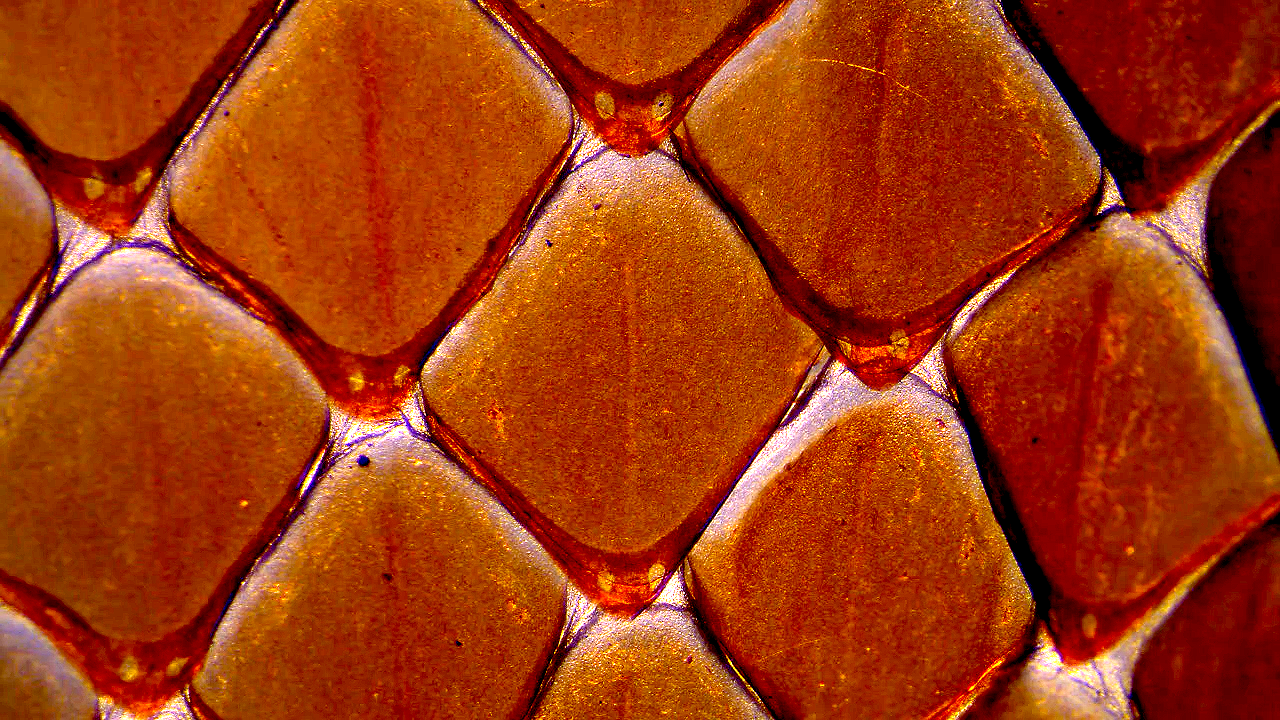
Shed skin of a black rat snake (Pantherophis sp.) under transmitted light

Western rat snakes typically range 106.7 ‒183 cm. (42 ‒ 72 in.) in total length, with a record individual of 218.4 cm. (86 in.).

Juveniles are strongly patterned with brown blotches on a gray background (like miniature fox snakes: P. gloydi, P. ramspotti, and P. vulpinus). Darkening occurs rapidly as they grow. Adults are glossy black above with white lips, chin, and throat. Sometimes, traces of the "obsolete" juvenile pattern are still discernible in the skin between the scales, especially when stretched after a heavy meal.

== Common names ==
Other common names for Pantherophis obsoletus include gray rat snake, black chicken snake, black coluber, chicken snake, mountain black snake, mountain pilot snake, pilot, rat snake, rusty black snake, scaly black snake, cow snake, sleepy John, and white-throated racer.

== Behavior ==
When not fully grown, rat snakes of the genus Pantherophis are subject to predation by many animals, including other snakes. Once they attain maturity, they are readily preyed on by mammalian carnivores (including the American mink, which weighs no more than an adult rat snake) and large birds of prey (especially red-tailed hawks). When startled, they may freeze and wrinkle themselves into a series of kinks. If they feel further threatened, they may flee quickly or tail vibrate; although this act of tail vibration is indeed a behavior that rat snakes share with rattlesnakes, it is not a form of mimicry, as researchers have observed that snakes have used this method of tail vibration as a defense mechanism against predation long before the emergence of rattlesnakes. They are also capable of producing a foul-smelling musk, which they will release onto predators if picked up. They spread the musk with their tails in hopes of deterring the threat. When cornered or provoked, rat snakes are known to stand their ground and can become aggressive. Counterattacks on large birds of prey, often committed by large snakes in excess of 150 cm (59 in) in length, have resulted in violent, prolonged struggles. Using its infamous agility and the great strength of its muscular coils, the black rat snake is sometimes able to overwhelm and kill formidable avian predators such as red-tailed hawks, great horned owls, and red-shouldered hawks, though in many cases, the bird is able to kill the snake or both combatants may even die.

== Feeding ==
Pantherophis obsoletus is a constrictor, meaning it squeezes its prey to the point of cardiovascular collapse due to obstructive shock, coiling around small animals and tightening its grip until the prey can no longer circulate blood and dies of profound hypotension, before being eaten. Though it often consumes mice, voles, and rats, the western rat snake is far from a specialist at this kind of prey, and readily consumes any small vertebrate it can catch. Other prey opportunistically eaten by this species can include other snakes (including both those of its own and other species), frogs, lizards, moles, chipmunks, squirrels, juvenile rabbits, juvenile opossums, songbirds, and bird eggs. One snake was observed to consume an entire clutch of mallard eggs. Cavity-nesting bird species are seemingly especially prevalent in this snake's diet. The western rat snake has been noted as perhaps the top predator at purple martin colonies, as a single large snake can easily consume a number of eggs, hatchlings, and adults each summer. Several rat snake repelling methods have been offered to those putting up martin houses, but most are mixed in success.

== Reproduction ==
In Pantherophis obsoletus, mating takes place in late May and early June. The male snake wraps his tail around the female with their vents nearly touching. The male then everts one of his sex organs, a hemipenis, into the female sex organ, the cloaca. The mating lasts a few minutes to a few hours. After five weeks, the female lays about 12 to 20 eggs, which are 36–60 mm (1.4–2.4 in) long by 20–26.5 mm (0.79–1.04 in) wide. The eggs hatch about 65 to 70 days later in late August to early October. The hatchlings are 28–41 cm (11–16 in) in total length, and they look like miniature fox snakes.

== Taxonomy ==
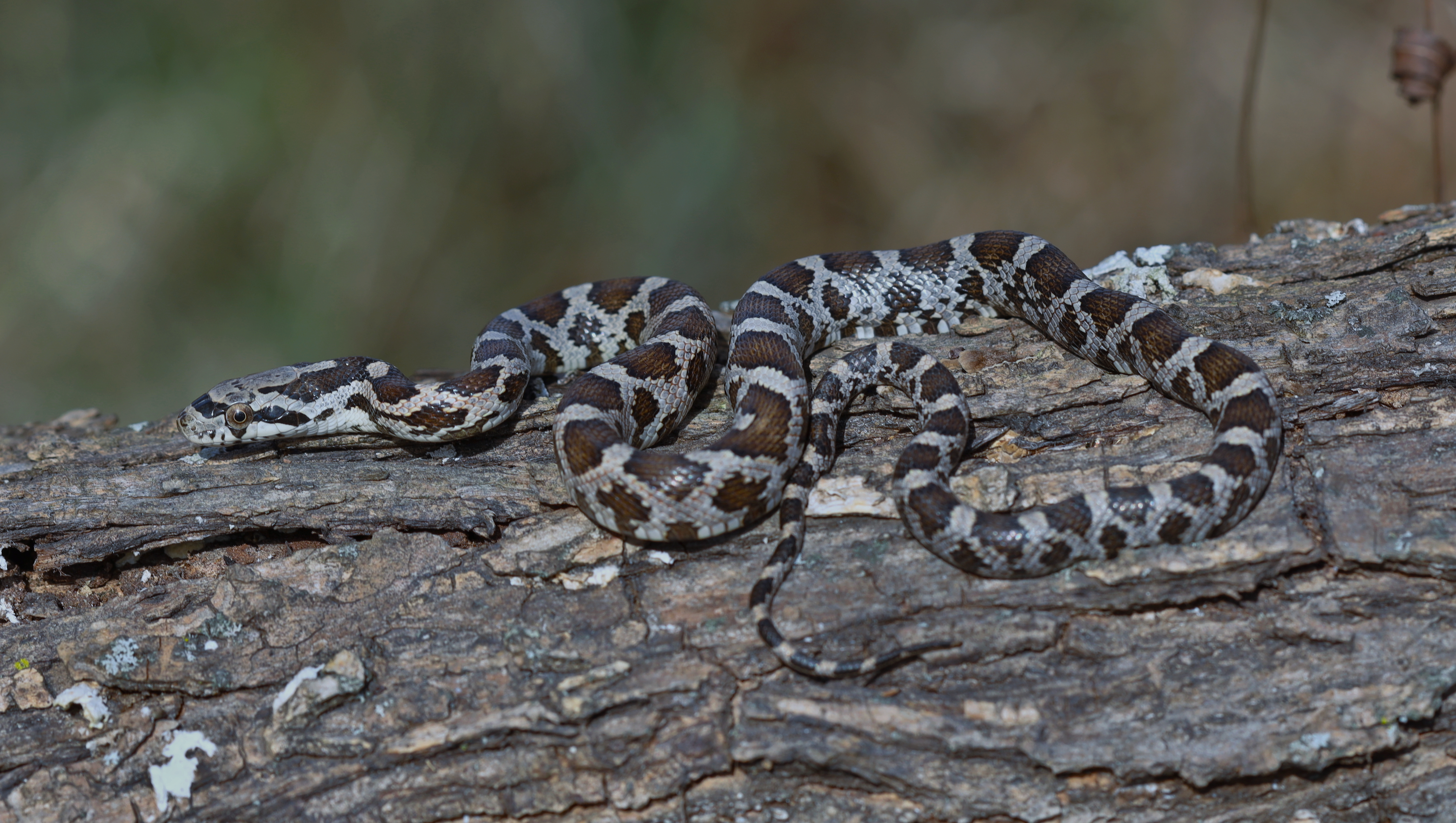
A juvenile western ratsnake from northern Missouri, exhibiting a bolder and brighter pattern that often becomes more obscure in maturity.

The species Pantherophis obsoletus has previously been placed (and is still placed by many) in the genus Elaphe, as Elaphe obsoleta. However, Utiger et al. found that Elaphe is broadly construed as paraphyletic, and placed this species in the genus Pantherophis. In addition, because Pantherophis is masculine, the specific epithet becomes the masculine obsoletus. The split of Pantherophis from Elaphe has been further confirmed by additional phylogenetic studies.

In 2001, Burbrink suggested this species be divided into three species based on geographic patterns of mitochondrial DNA diversity. He assigned new common names and resurrected old scientific names, resulting in these combinations: eastern ratsnake (Elaphe alleghaniensis, now Pantherophis alleghaniensis), central ratsnake (Elaphe spiloides, now Pantherophis spiloides), and western rat snake (Elaphe obsoleta, now Pantherophis obsoletus). However, these three species are not morphologically distinct and overlap in all examined morphological characters. More recent investigations have indicated P. alleghaniensis and P. spiloides interbreed freely in Ontario.

In 2008, Collins and Taggart resurrected the genus Scotophis for Burbrink's three taxa (i.e., Scotophis alleghaniensis, Scotophis spiloides, and Scotophis obsoletus) in response to the findings of Burbrink and Lawson, 2007. The justification for this nomenclatural change has been removed by more recent research.

== In captivity ==
The western rat snake is available captive-bred in the United States pet trade, and it has been bred for mutations such as leucistic, albino, and scaleless. However, it is not as popular as other colubrids such as corn snakes, kingsnakes, milksnakes, and hognose snakes. Opinions vary on the western rat snake's disposition, but captive-bred individuals are reported to be more docile than their wild counterparts. With appropriate care, this species may be expected to live 15 years in captivity, and possibly more.
