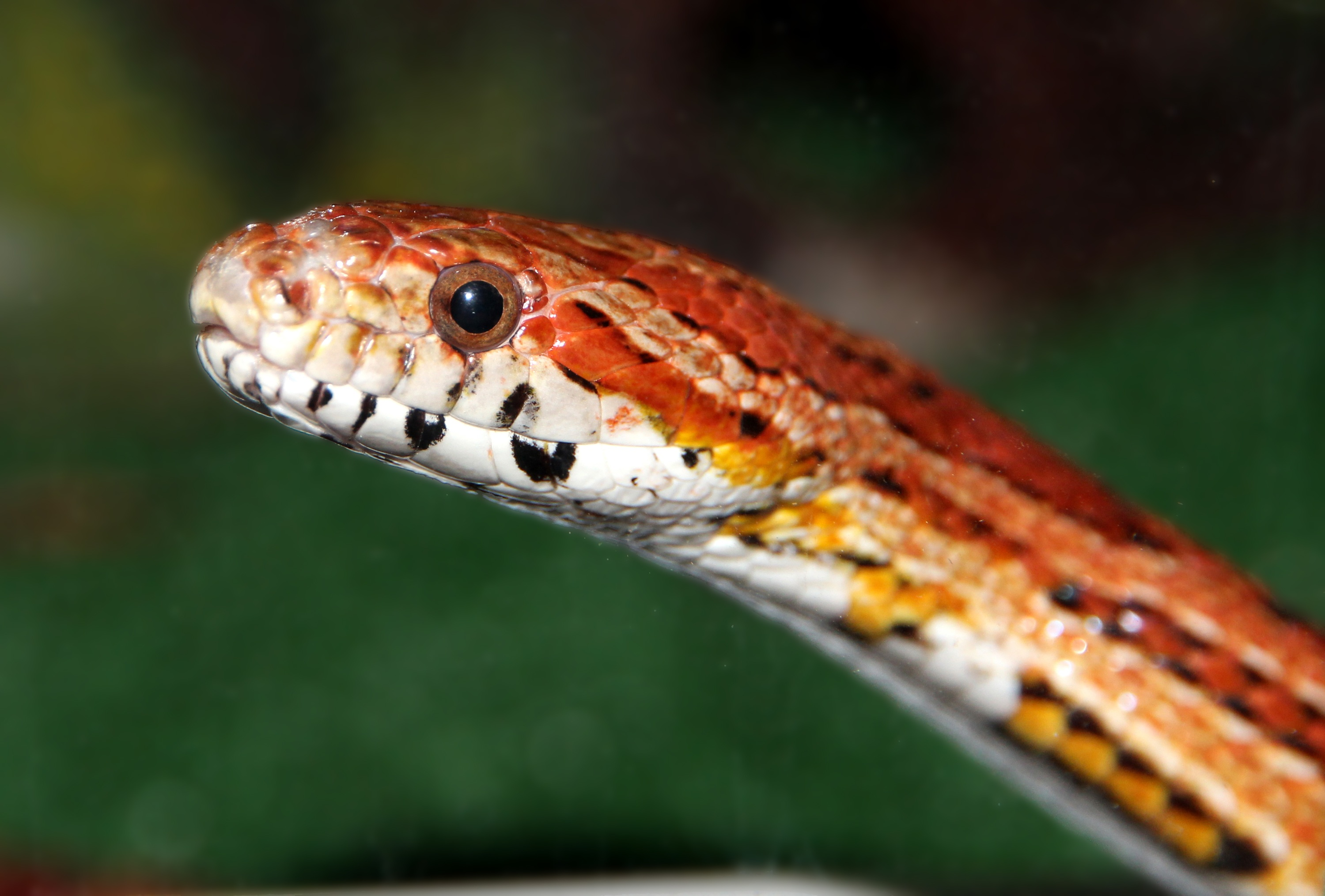
- Pantherophis guttatus

Scientific classification
- Kingdom: Animalia
- Phylum: Chordata
- Class: Reptilia
- Order: Squamata
- Suborder: Serpentes
- Family: Colubridae
- Tribe: Lampropeltini
- Genus: Pantherophis; Fitzinger, 1843

Type species
- Coluber guttatus Linnaeus, 1766

Synonyms
- Scotophis Baird & Girard, 1853; Scotophisus A.L. Herrera, 1899 (nomen emendatum); Palaeoelaphe Gilmore, 1938; Mintonius Collins & Taggart, 2008

= Pantherophis =

Pantherophis Temporal range: Middle Miocene-Holocene, 16.3–0 Ma

Genus of snakes

Pantherophis is a genus of nonvenomous colubrid snakes endemic to central and eastern regions of North America. It consists of the North American ratsnakes, the foxsnakes, and the cornsnakes. The genus, which contains 10 recognized species, first appeared in the fossil record in the Middle Miocene around 16.3 million years ago. They are a large terrestrial snake genus that lack subocular scales. Originally classified in the genus Elaphe, phylogenetic studies have found this taxon to be closely related to Pituophis. As with all snakes Pantherophis is an obligate faunivore with a diet that consists of small mammals, birds, reptiles and amphibians, and even insects. While many species' conservation status is categorized as "least concern", many local populations in some species have declined where some places have them listed as federally protected. The corn snake (P. guttatus) is a popular pet reptile, due to the availability of captive-bred animals, their low maintenance and calm disposition, and the variety of color morphs. There are other species of Pantherophis that are in the pet trade, though are not as popular as the corn snake.

== Field characteristics ==
Member species in the genus Pantherophis are large terrestrial snakes, built for constriction. Pantherophis is characterized by having a divided cloacal plate. The dorsal scales are arranged in more than 30 rows around the body, and at least some of these are keeled, albeit faintly. All species lack subocular scales. Each of the ten or so species can be further distinguished based on subtle characteristics, such as color markings, scale nuances, and geographic range.

== Systematics and paleontology ==
=== Taxonomy ===
The taxonomy of Pantherophis has been a complicated area of research. The genus was named by the Austrian zoologist Leopold Fitzinger in 1843, with the type species being Pantherophis guttatus. Shortly after, the genus was then considered to be a junior synonym of the otherwise Old World genus Elaphe. However the morphology of the hemipenes, the dentition, and the squamatization found the New World species to be closer to the genus Pituophis (gopher snakes, pine snakes, and bullsnakes). Subsequent molecular studies have found support of the sister grouping between Pituophis and the North American Elaphe species, which resulted in the resurrection of the genus Pantherophis. These two genera, along with several other North American endemic taxa like Lampropeltis belong to the tribe Lampropeltini.

There are currently four subgenera of Pantherophis, of which three are extant and one is extinct: Scotophis Baird & Girard, 1853, for the ratsnakes; †Palaeoelaphe Gilmore, 1938, for a Miocene fossil species; Mintonius Collins & Taggart, 2008, for the foxsnakes; and Pantherophis for the cornsnake complex. There are a few studies that suggested the possibility that Pantherophis is paraphyletic in respect to Pituophis. To maintain taxonomic stability, some of the aforementioned subgenera are reevaluated into proper genera. This, however, has not been supported by larger scale molecular trees concerning the relationships of various snake taxa.

=== Phylogeny ===
The interspecies relationships of Pantherophis usually has the subgenera Pantherophis and Mintonius being sister taxa, with Scotophis at the root of the genus. Below is the widely supported phylogenetic tree of the species in the genus.

- Pantherophis
  - Scotophis
    - - Pantherophis bairdi (Baird's rat snake)
      - Pantherophis obsoletus (western rat snake)
    - - Pantherophis quadrivittatus (yellow ratsnake)
      - Pantherophis alleghaniensis (central ratsnake)
  - - Mintonius
      - Pantherophis vulpinus (eastern fox snake)
      - Pantherophis ramspotti (western fox snake)
    - Pantherophis
      - Pantherophis guttatus (corn snake)
      - - Pantherophis slowinskii (Slowinsk's corn snake)
        - Pantherophis emoryi (Great Plains rat snake)

=== Extant species ===
Below is the list of valid species with their geographic distributions.

Genus Pantherophis Fitzinger, 1843
Subgenus Scotophis Baird & Girard, 1853
Scientific name	Common name	Geographic distribution	Image figure
Pantherophis bairdi (Yarrow, 1880)	Baird's ratsnake	Southwestern United States and adjacent northeastern Mexico.	
Pantherophis obsoletus (Say, 1823)	western ratsnake or Texas ratsnake	West of the Mississippi River, from eastern and southern Iowa southward through Missouri and Arkansas to western Louisiana, westward to eastern Texas, northward through Oklahoma and eastern Kansas to southeastern Nebraska.	
Pantherophis quadrivittatus (Holbrook, 1836)	yellow ratsnake	United States east of the Apalachicola River in Florida, east of the Chattahoochee River in Georgia, east of the Appalachian Mountains, north to southeastern Virginia, South Carolina, North Carolina, Georgia, south to the Florida Keys.	
Pantherophis alleghaniensis (Holbrook, 1836)	central ratsnake	Eastern and Central United States, west of the Appalachian Mountains, north of southeastern Virginia, and east of the Mississippi River	
Subgenus Mintonius Collins & Taggart, 2008
Pantherophis ramspotti Crother, White, Savage, Eckstut, Graham & Gardner, 2011	western foxsnake	United States, west of the Mississippi River.	
Pantherophis vulpinus (Baird & Girard, 1853)	eastern foxsnake	Eastern Great Lakes region of the United States, as well as adjacent western Ontario in Canada.	
Subgenus Pantherophis Fitzinger, 1843
Pantherophis guttatus (Linnaeus, 1766)	corn snake	Southeastern and central United States.	
Pantherophis emoryi (Baird & Girard, 1853)	Great Plains ratsnake	United States, from Missouri to Nebraska, to Colorado, south to Texas, and into northern Mexico	

Nota bene: In this list, a binomial authority in parentheses indicates that the species was originally described in a genus other than Pantherophis.

=== Fossil remains ===
The fossil record of Pantherophis is the Middle Miocene to Upper Pleistocene. In addition to fossil remains of some of the extant species, there are fragmentary Pantherophis remains throughout the second half of the Cenozoic in North America. Only three fossil species have been described from more complete remains. The Early Pliocene P. buisi which might be a basal species in the Scotophis subgenus, and P. kansensis which is the sole species in the subgenus of Palaeoelaphe, the trunk vertebrae similar to Mintonius subgenus. P. nebraskensis was another valid species, but it is considered to be a junior synonym of P. kansensis.
