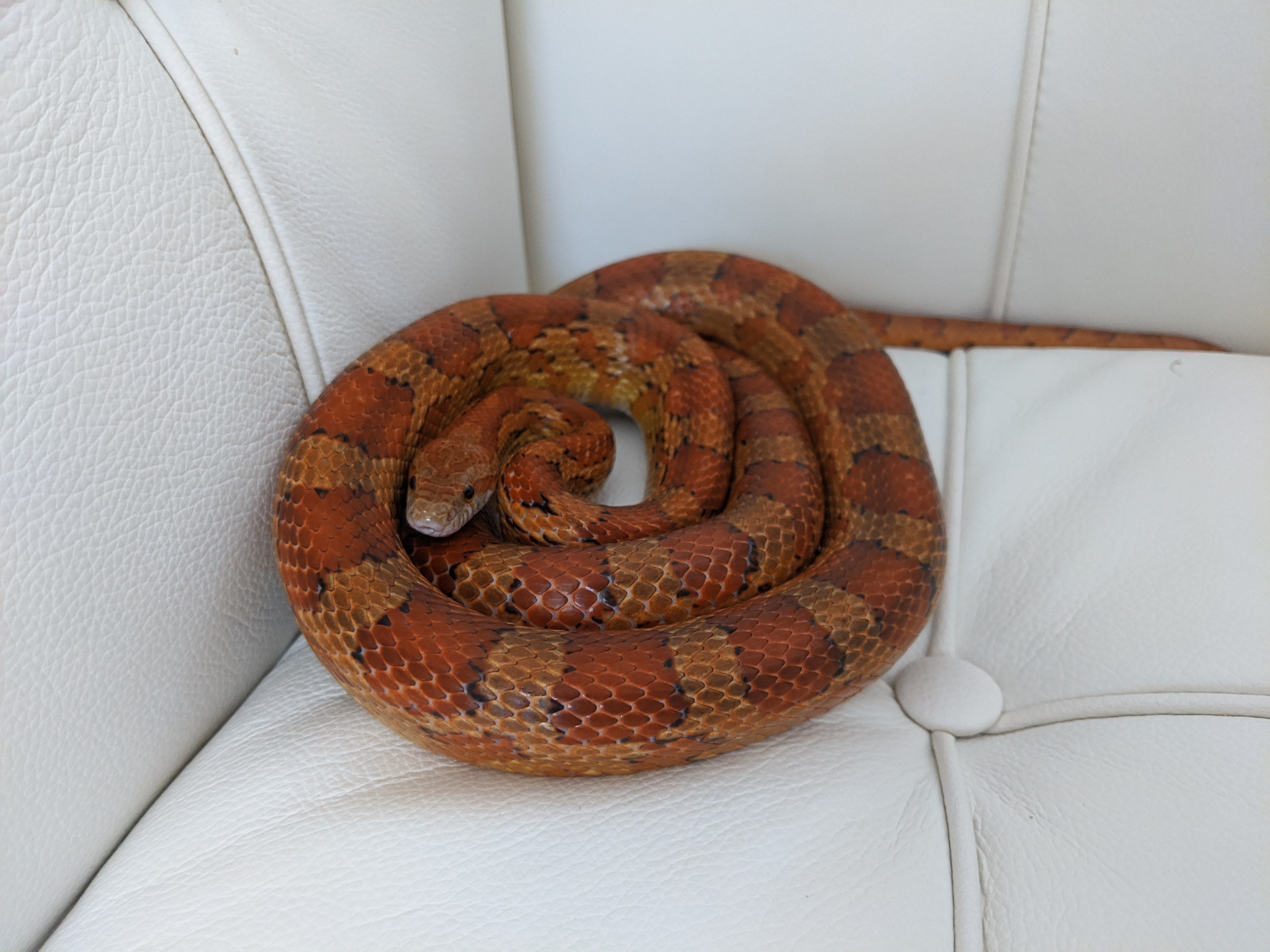

Conservation status
- Least Concern (IUCN 3.1)

Scientific classification
- Kingdom: Animalia
- Phylum: Chordata
- Class: Reptilia
- Order: Squamata
- Suborder: Serpentes
- Family: Colubridae
- Genus: Pantherophis
- Species: P. guttatus

Binomial name
- Pantherophis guttatus (Linnaeus, 1766)

Synonyms
- Coluber guttatus Linnaeus, 1766; Elaphis guttatus — A.M.C. Duméril, Bibron & A.H.A. Duméril, 1854; Elaphe guttata — Stejneger & Barbour, 1917; Pantherophis guttatus — Utiger et al., 2002

= Corn snake =

Species of snake

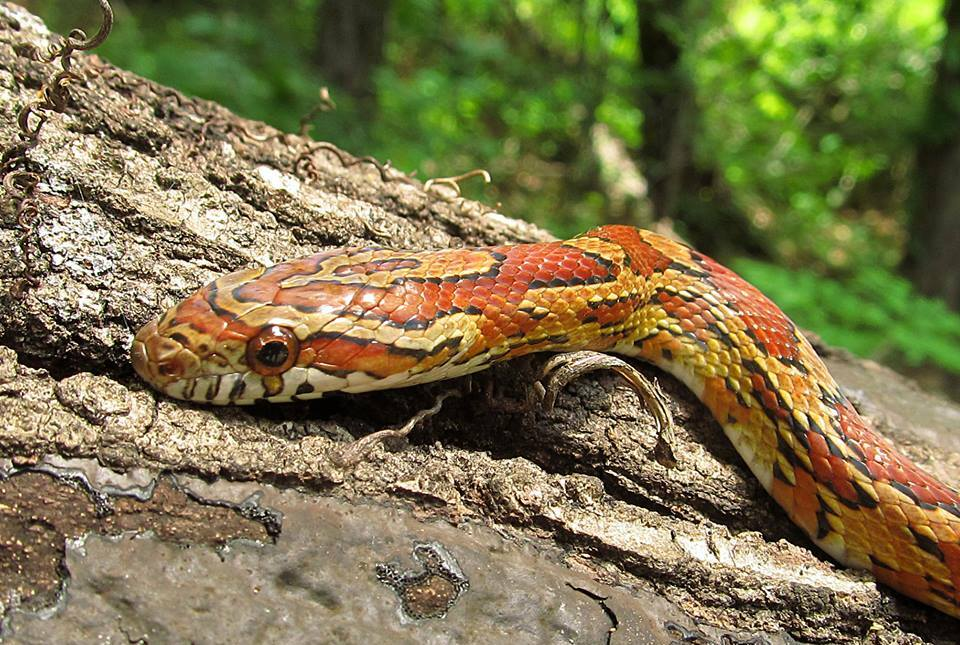
A close-up portrait

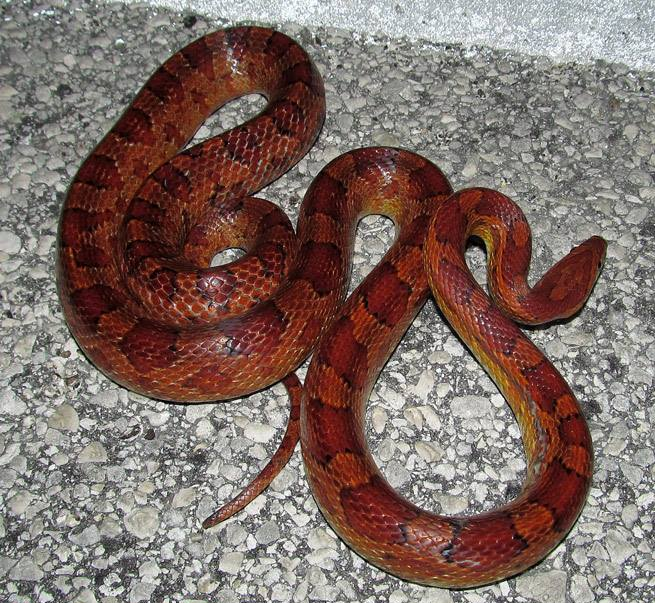
Gravid female

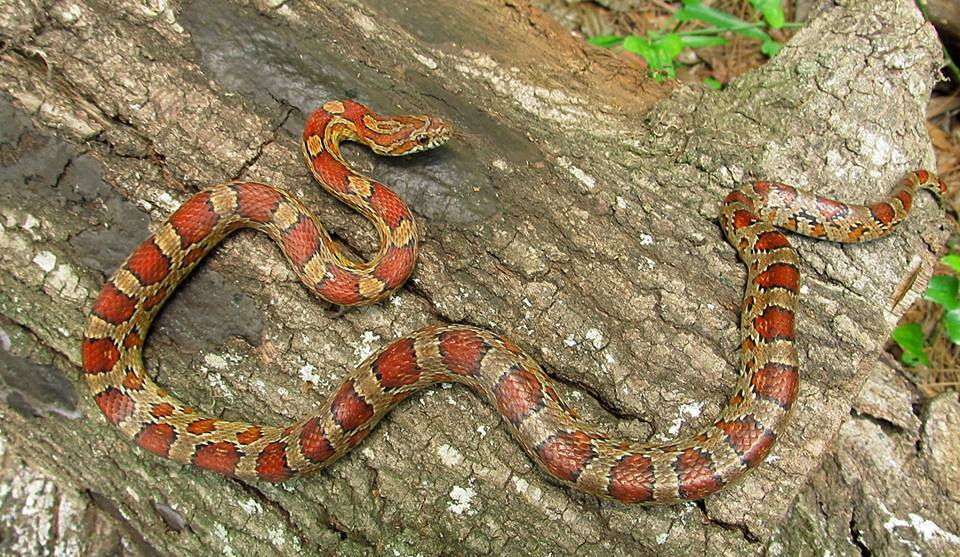
Young corn snake

The corn snake (Pantherophis guttatus), sometimes called the red rat snake, is a species of North American rat snake in the family Colubridae. The species subdues its small prey by constriction. It is found throughout the southeastern and central United States. Though superficially resembling the venomous copperhead (Agkistrodon contortrix) and often killed as a result of this mistaken identity, the corn snake lacks functional venom and is harmless to humans. The corn snake is beneficial to humans because it helps control populations of wild rodent pests that damage crops and spread disease.

== Nomenclature ==
The corn snake is named for the species' regular presence near grain stores, where it preys on mice and rats that eat harvested corn (maize). The Oxford English Dictionary cites this usage as far back as 1675, whilst other sources maintain that the corn snake is so-named because the distinctive, nearly-checkered pattern of the snake's belly scales resembles the kernels of variegated corn.

The genus name Panthērophis literally means "panther snake" in reference to the snake's panther-like skin pattern; from Ancient Greek: πάνθηρ : pánthēr "panther", and Ancient Greek: ὄφις : óphis "snake".

The species name is from Latin: guttatus meaning "spotted, speckled", again in reference to the snake's skin pattern.

== Description ==
As an adult the corn snake may have a total length (including tail) of 61–182 cm (2.0–6.0 ft). In the wild, it usually lives around ten to fifteen years, but in captivity can live to an age of 23 years or more. The record for the oldest corn snake in captivity was 32 years and 3 months. The natural corn snake is usually orange or brown bodied with large red blotches outlined in black down their backs. The belly has distinctive rows of alternating black and white marks. This black and white checker pattern is similar to Indian corn (maize) which is where the name corn snake may have come from. The corn snake can be distinguished from a copperhead by the corn snake's brighter colors, slender build, slim head, round pupils, and lack of heat-sensing pits.

== Taxonomy ==
Until 2002, the corn snake was considered to have two subspecies: the nominate subspecies (P. g. guttatus) described here and the Great Plains rat snake (P. g. emoryi). The latter has since been split off as its own species (P. emoryi), but is still occasionally treated as a subspecies of the corn snake by hobbyists.

P. guttatus has been suggested to be split into three species: the corn snake (P. guttatus), the Great Plains rat snake (P. emoryi, corresponding with the subspecies P. g. emoryi), and Slowinski's corn snake (P. slowinskii, occurring in western Louisiana and adjacent Texas).

P. guttatus was previously placed in the genus Elaphe, but Elaphe was found to be paraphyletic by Utiger et al., leading to placement of this species in the genus Pantherophis. The placement of P. guttatus and several related species in Pantherophis rather than in Elaphe has been confirmed by further phylogenetic studies. Many reference materials still use the synonym Elaphe guttata. Molecular data have shown that the corn snake is actually more closely related to kingsnakes (genus Lampropeltis) than it is to the Old World rat snakes (genus Elaphe) with which it was formerly classified. The corn snake has even been bred in captivity with the California kingsnake (Lampropeltis californiae) to produce fertile hybrids known as "jungle corn snakes".

== Range ==
=== Natural habitat ===
In the wild, the corn snake prefers habitats such as overgrown fields, forest openings, trees, palmetto flatwoods, and abandoned or seldom-used buildings and farms, from sea level to as high as 6,000 ft (1,800 m). Typically, the corn snake remains on the ground until the age of four months but can ascend trees, cliffs, and other elevated surfaces. It can be found in the Southeastern United States ranging from New Jersey to the Florida Keys.

In colder regions, the corn snake brumates during winter. However, in the more temperate climate along the coast, it shelters in rock crevices and logs during cold weather. It also can find shelter in small, closed spaces, such as under a house, and come out on warm days to soak up the heat of the sun. During cold weather, the corn snake is less active so it hunts less.

=== Introduced range ===
Often called the "American corn snake", guttatus is a proscribed pest in much of Australia. There are active extermination campaigns and advice for the public in Victoria, New South Wales, and Queensland.

== Reproduction ==
It has been found that corn snakes (along with other colubrids) reach sexual maturity by means of size, as opposed to age.

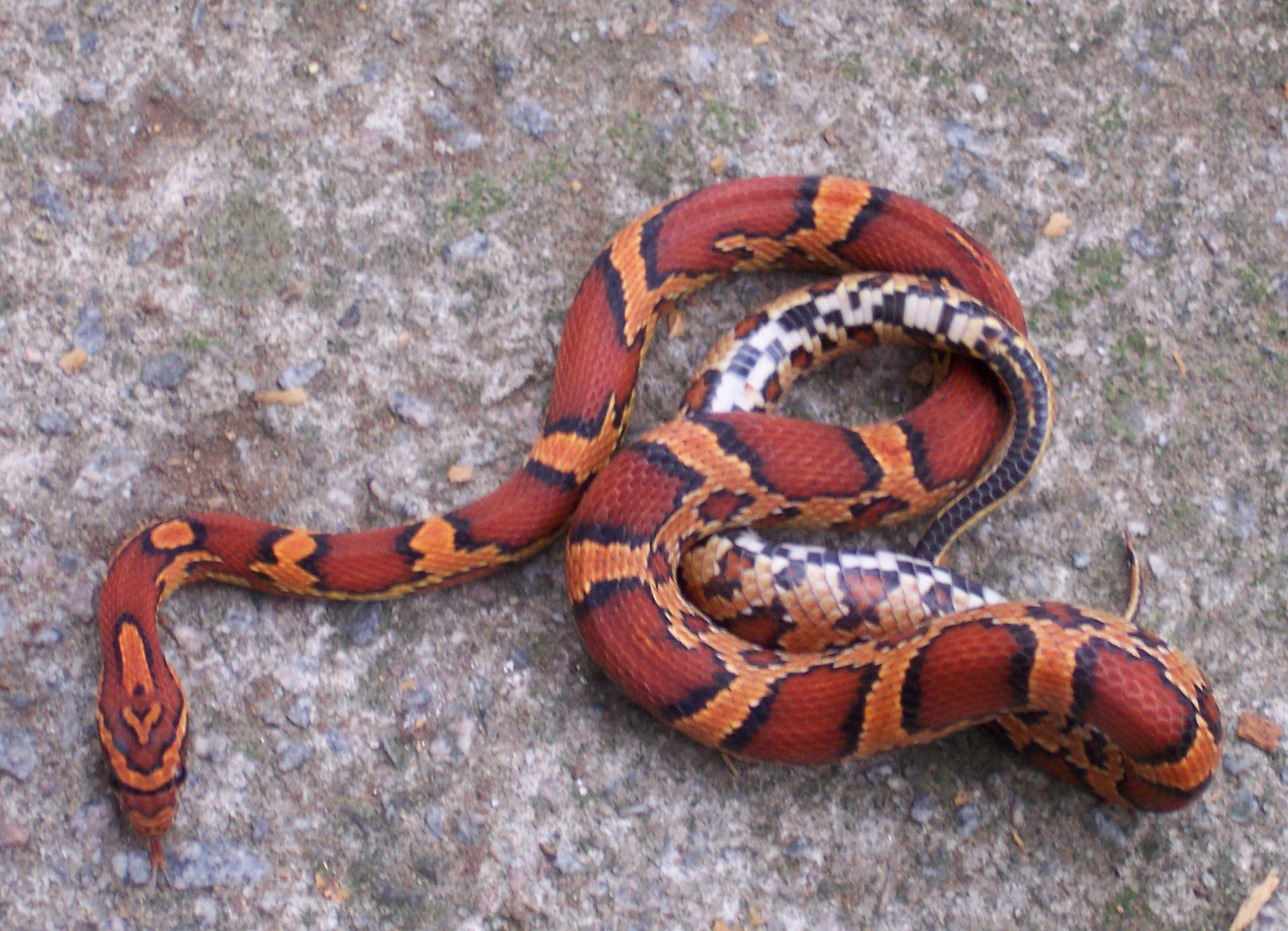
Young Okeetee Phase corn snake

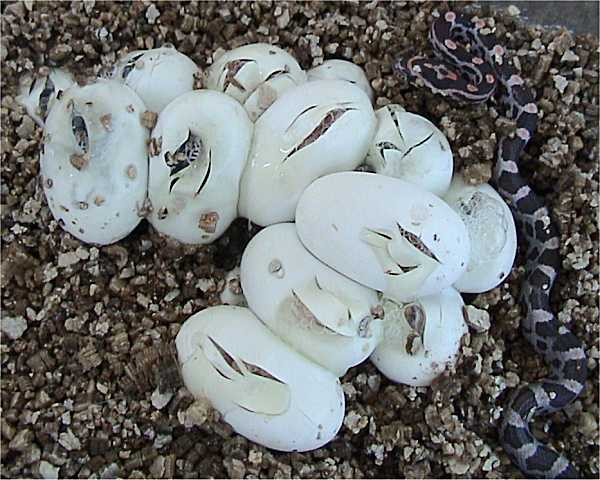
Baby corn snakes hatching from their eggs

Corn snakes are relatively easy to breed. Although not necessary, they are usually put through a cooling (also known as brumation) period that takes 60–90 days to get them ready for breeding. Corn snakes brumate around 10 to 16 °C (50 to 61 °F) in a place where they cannot be disturbed and with little sunlight.

Corn snakes usually breed shortly after the winter cooling. The male courts the female primarily with tactile and chemical cues, then everts one of his hemipenes, inserts it into the female, and ejaculates his sperm. If the female is ovulating, the eggs will be fertilized and she will begin sequestering nutrients into the eggs, then secreting a shell.

Egg-laying occurs slightly more than a month after mating, with 12–24 eggs deposited into a warm, moist, hidden location. Once laid, the adult snake abandons the eggs and does not return to them. The eggs are oblong with leathery, flexible shells. About 10 weeks after laying, the young snakes use a specialized scale called an egg tooth to slice slits in the egg shell, from which they emerge at about 5 in (13 cm) long.

Reproduction in captivity has to be done correctly so the clutch's mortality rate decreases. This includes accurate sexing, establishing proper pre-breeding conditioning, and timely pairing of adults. Corn snakes are temperate zone colubrids, and share a reproductive pattern where females increase their feeding during summer and fall. This only applies to corn snakes that are sexually mature, which typically indicates the snake is around 75 cm (30 inches) in length or weight 250 g.

== Diet ==
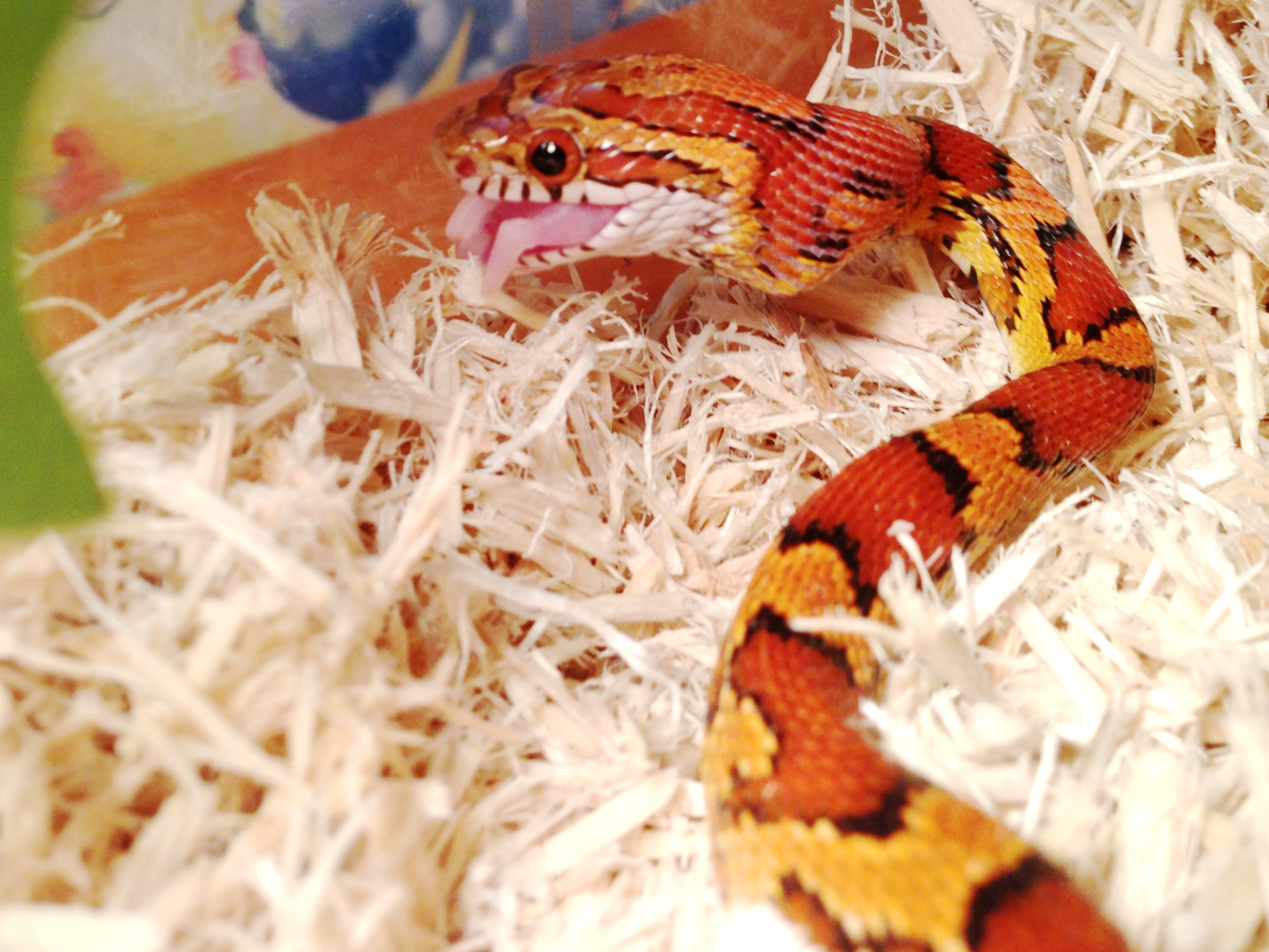
Captive corn snake eating young mouse

Like all snakes, corn snakes are carnivorous and, in the wild, they eat every few days and consume anything smaller than they are, including other corn snakes. Over half of their diet consists of rodents, such as hispid cotton rats, white-footed mice and other mammal prey, such as eastern moles. In Florida, their diet mainly consists of reptiles and amphibians, which this may be a cause for this region’s smaller snake sizes. Corn snakes will also climb trees and swallow bird eggs from unguarded nests.

Seasons play a large role in the thermal regulation patterns of corn snakes, which is the main mechanism of digestion for snakes. During fall, corn snakes maintain a body temperature approximately 3 degrees Celsius higher than the surrounding environment after consuming a meal, while corn snakes in the winter are not seen to thermoregulate after digestion. Captive snakes do this by using heat mats as an underneath heat source replicates their natural conditions. Corn snakes demonstrate nocturnal patterns, and use the warm ground at night to thermoregulate, therefore heat mats replicate this source.

American "rat snakes", such as P. guttatus, had venomous ancestors, which lost their venom after they evolved constriction as a means of prey capture. However, they are still capable of producing a foul-smelling musk and rattling their tail when threatened.

== Intelligence and behavior ==
Like many species of the Colubridae, corn snakes exhibit defensive tail vibration behavior. Behavioral and chemosensory studies with corn snakes suggest that odor cues are of primary importance for prey detection, whereas visual cues are of secondary importance.

A study conducted by Dr. David Holzman of the University of Rochester in 1999 found that snakes' capacity for spatial learning rivals those of birds and rodents. Holzman challenged the typical testing method that was being used by biologists to examine snakes' navigational abilities, claiming the structure of the arena itself was biologically in favor of rodents. He hypothesized that if the typical arena being used to test the animals was modified to cater to snakes' instinctive goals, thus providing them with problem sets that they would likely encounter in their natural environment, this would give a more accurate view of their intelligence.

The study involved testing 24 captive-bred corn snakes, placing them in an open tub with walls too high for them to climb out. Eight holes were cut out underneath, with one hole leading to a shelter. An intense light was positioned to shine directly on the arena, exploiting the snake's natural aversion to bright open spaces. This provided a biologically meaningful objective for the snakes: to seek out cozy dark shelter.

The study found that when given the incentive of finding shelter, the snakes exhibited an acute ability to learn and navigate their surroundings. They also found snakes rely on their sense of vision much more than many herpetologists had previously assumed. They found that younger snakes were able to more quickly locate the holes than older snakes, as the younger snakes were more resourceful in their application of senses and older snakes relied more heavily on their sense of sight.

== Locomotion ==
Arboreal movement is poorly understood, despite many snakes like the Corn Snake being an arboreal species. A study conducted Henry C. Astley and Bruce C. Jayne from the University of Cincinnati found that Corn Snakes (Elaphe guttata) had three qualitative features resembling tunnel concertina locomotion: alternating bends to the left and right, stopping periodically, and some portion of the body always having static contact with the substrate.

Four adult corn snakes with similar snout–vent lengths, total lengths, mid-body lateral diameters, and masses were placed on different perches. The perches were seven different cylinders (diameters 1.6–21 cm) with five inclines (horizontal, ±45° and ±90°).

Results indicated that when perches were placed at 45° or 90°, snakes were unable to move uphill or downhill only on the larger diameter cylinders. Additionally, on horizontal and uphill perches the corn snakes used concertina locomotion of stopping and gripping. On downhill movement, the snakes slid numerously and would have to grasp the perch to reduce speed. When looking at tunnels, the tunnel width barely affected the speeds of concertina locomotion.

== In captivity ==
Corn snakes are one of the most popular types of snakes to keep in captivity or as pets, second only to the ball python. Outside of their native range, they are a popular pet snake in Brazil, where they risk becoming an invasive species. Their size, calm temperament, and ease of care contribute to this popularity. Captive corn snakes tolerate being handled by their owners, even for extended periods.

== Variations ==
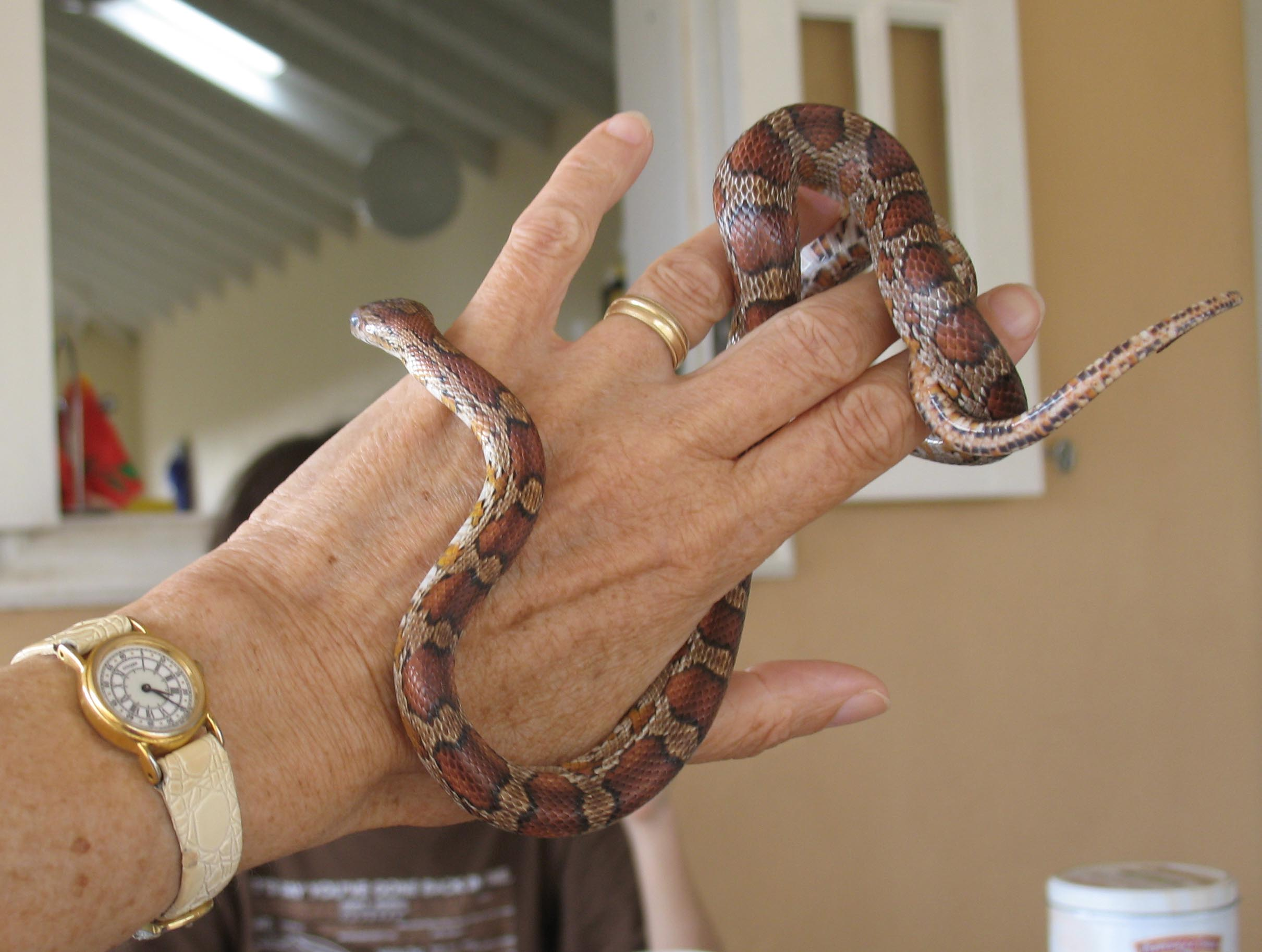
A docile young corn snake (an introduced species) captured from the wild on the island of Nevis, West Indies, in 2009

After many generations of selective breeding, captive bred corn snakes are found in a wide variety of different colors and patterns. These result from recombining the dominant and recessive genes that code for proteins involved in chromatophore development, maintenance, or function. New variations, or morphs, become available every year as breeders gain a better understanding of the genetics involved.

=== Color morphs ===
- Normal / Carolina / Wildtype – Orange with black lines around red-colored saddle markings going down their back and with black-and-white checkered bellies. Regional diversity is found in wild-caught corn snakes, the most popular being the Miami and Okeetee Phases. These are the most commonly seen corn snakes.
- Miami Phase (originates in the Florida Wildtype) – Usually smaller corn snakes with some specimens having highly contrasting light silver to gray ground color with red or orange saddle markings surrounded in black. Selective breeding has lightened the ground color and darkened the saddle marks. The "Miami" name is now considered an appearance trait.
- Okeetee Phase – Characterized by deep red dorsal saddle marks, surrounded by very black borders on a bright orange ground color. As with the Miami Phase, selective breeding has changed the term "Okeetee" to an appearance rather than a locality. Some on the market originate solely from selectively breeding corn snakes from the Okeetee Hunt Club.
- Candy-cane (selectively bred amelanistic) – Amelanistic corn snakes, bred toward the ideal of red or orange saddle marks on a white background. Some were produced using light Creamsicle (an amel hybrid from Great Plains rat snake x corn snake crosses) bred with Miami Phase corn snakes. Some Candy-canes will develop orange coloration around the neck region as they mature and many labeled as Candy-canes later develop significant amounts of yellow or orange in the ground color. The contrast they have as hatchlings often fades with maturity.
- Reverse Okeetee (selectively bred amelanistic) – An amelanistic Okeetee Phase corn snake, which has the normal black rings around the saddle marks replaced with wide white rings. Ideal specimens are high contrast snakes with light orange to yellow background and dark orange/red saddles. Note: An Albino Okeetee is not a locale-specific Okeetee—it is a selectively bred amelanistic.
- Fluorescent Orange (selectively bred amelanistic) – A designer amelanistic corn snake that develops white borders around bright red saddle marks as adults on an orange background.
- Sunglow (selectively bred amelanistic) – Another designer amelanistic corn snake that lacks the usual white speckling that often appears in most albinos and selected for exceptionally bright ground color. The orange background surrounds dark orange saddle marks.
- Blood Red (selectively bred "diffused") – Carry a recessive trait (known as diffused) that eliminates the ventral checkered patterns. These originated from a somewhat unicolor Jacksonville, Florida and Gainesville, Florida strain of corn snake. Through selective breeding, an almost solid ground color has been produced. Hatchlings have a visible pattern that can fade as they mature into a solid orange-red to ash-red colored snake. The earlier Blood Red corn snakes tended to have large clutches of smaller than average eggs that produce hard-to-feed offspring, though this is no longer the case.
- Crimson (Hypomelanistic + Miami) – Very light high contrast corn snakes, with a light background and dark red/orange saddle marks.
- Anerythristic (anerythristic type A, sometimes called "Black Albino") – The complement to amelanism. The inherited recessive mutation of lacking erythrin (red, yellow and orange) pigments produces a corn snake that is mostly black, gray and brown. When mature, many anerythristic type A corn snakes develop yellow on their neck regions, which is a result of the carotenoids in their diet. Natural populations of anerythristic corn snakes can be found in Southern Florida.

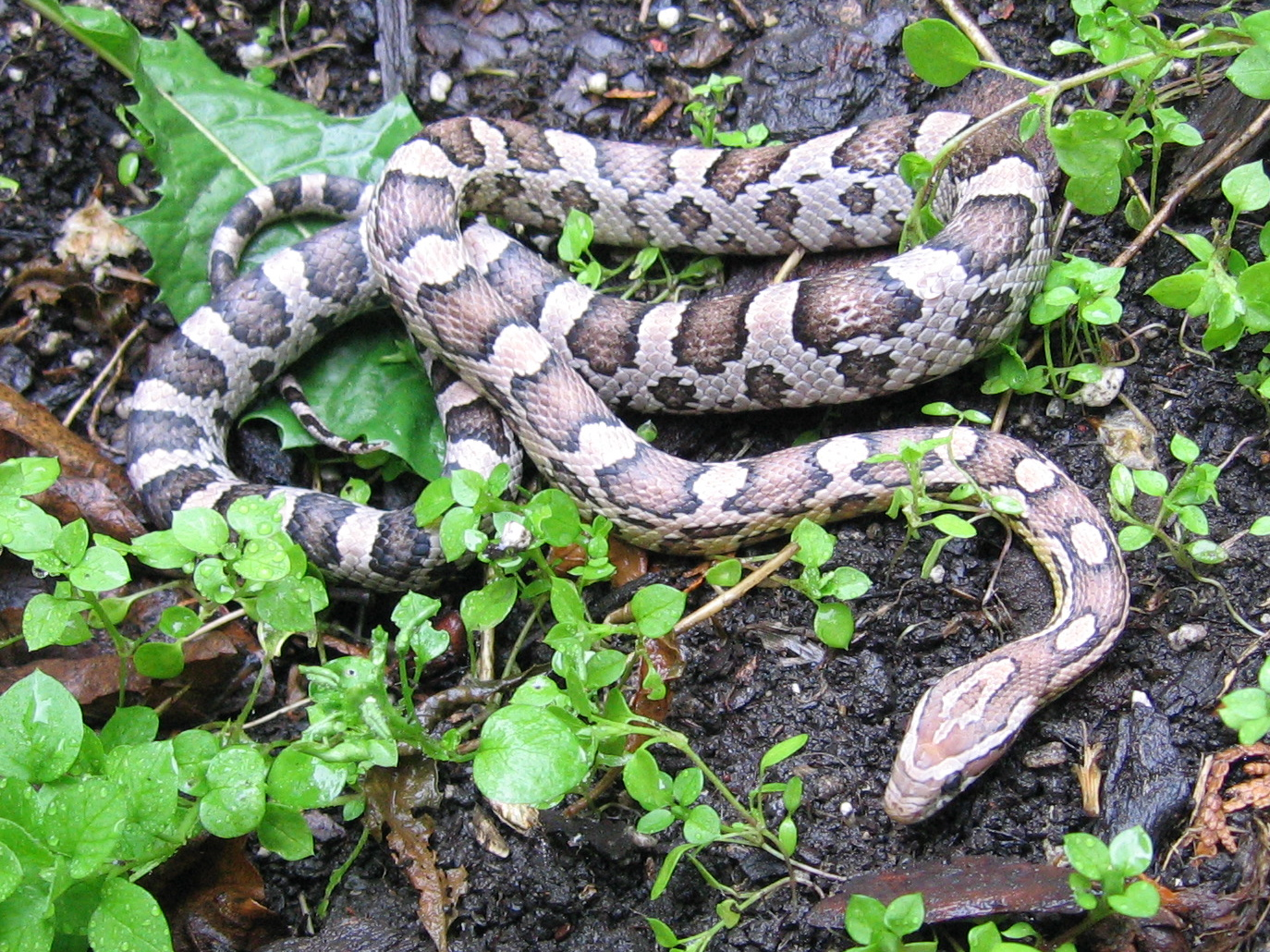
An anerythristic corn snake

- Charcoal (sometimes known as anerythristic type B) – Can lack the yellow color pigment usually found in all corn snakes. They are a more muted contrast compared to Anerythristics.
- Caramel – Another Rich Zuchowski-engineered corn snake. The background is varying shades of yellow to yellow-brown. Dorsal saddle marks vary from caramel yellow to brown and chocolate brown.
- Lavender – Have a light pink background with darker purple-gray markings. They also have ruby- to burgundy-colored eyes.
- Cinder – Originated with Upper Keys corn snakes and, as such, are often built slimmer than most other morphs. They may resemble anerythristics, but they have wavy borders around their saddles.
- Kastanie – Hatch out looking nearly anerythristic, but gain some color as they mature, to eventually take on a chestnut coloration. This gene was first discovered in Germany.
- Hypomelanistic (or Hypo for short) – Carry a recessive trait that reduces the dark pigments, causing the reds, whites and oranges to become more vivid. Their eyes remain dark. They range in appearance between amelanistic corn snakes to normal corn snakes with greatly reduced melanin.
- Ultra – A hypomelanistic-like gene that is an allele to the amelanistic gene. Ultra corn snakes have light gray lines in place of black. The Ultra gene is derived from the gray rat snake (Pantherophis spiloides). All Ultra and Ultramel corn snakes have some amount of gray rat snake in them.
- Ultramel – An intermediate appearance between Ultra and amel, which is the result of being heterozygous for Ultra and amel at the albino locus.
- Dilute – Another melanin-reducing gene in which the corn snake looks as if it is getting ready to shed.
- Sunkissed – A hypo-like gene which was first found in Kathy Love's corn snake colony.
- Lava – An extreme hypo-like gene which was discovered by Joe Pierce and named by Jeff Mohr. What would normally be black pigment in these corn snakes is, instead, a grayish-purple.

=== Pattern morphs ===
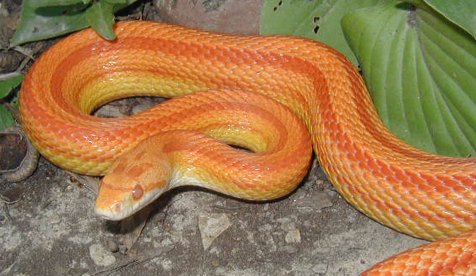
Amelanistic striped corn snake

- Motley – Has a clear belly and an "inverted" spotting pattern. May also appear as stripes or dashes.
- Striped – This morph also has a clear belly and a striping pattern. Unlike the Motley corn snake, the striped corn snake's colors will not connect, but may sometimes break up and take on a "cubed" appearance. Cubes and spots on a striped corn snake are the same as the saddle color on a similar-looking normal corn snake, unlike Motley corn snakes. Striped is both allelic and recessive to Motley, so breeding a striped corn snake and a (homozygous) Motley corn snake will result in all-Motley corn snakes and then breeding the (heterozygous) Motley corn snake offspring will result in ¾ Motley corn snakes and ¼ striped corn snakes.
- Diffused – Diffuses the patterning on the sides and eliminates the belly pattern. It is one component of the Blood Red morph.
- Sunkissed – While considered a hypo-like gene, sunkissed corn snakes also have other effects, such as rounded saddles and unusual head patterns.
- Aztec, Zigzag and Banded – Selectively bred multigenetic morphs that are not dependent on a single gene.

=== Compound morphs ===
There are tens of thousands of possible compound morphs. Some of the most popular ones are listed here.

- Snow (amelanistic + Anerythristic) – As hatchlings, this color variation is composed of white and pink blotches. These corn snakes are predominantly white and tend to have yellow neck and throat regions when mature (due to carotenoid retention in their diet). Light blotches and background colors have subtle shades of beige, ivory, pink, green or yellow.
- Blizzard (amelanistic + Charcoal) – Totally white with red eyes, with very little to no visible pattern. This morph is formed by combining amelanistic (amel) gene and anerythristic gene.
- Ghost (Hypomelanistic + Anerythristic type A) – Exhibit varying shades of grays and browns on a lighter background. These often create pastel colors in lavenders, pinks, oranges and tans.
- Phantom – A combination of Charcoal and Hypomelanistic.
- Pewter (Charcoal + Diffused) – Silvery-lavender, with very little pattern as adults.
- Butter (amelanistic + Caramel) – A two-tone yellow corn snake.
- Amber (Hypomelanistic + Caramel) – Have amber-colored markings on a light brown background.

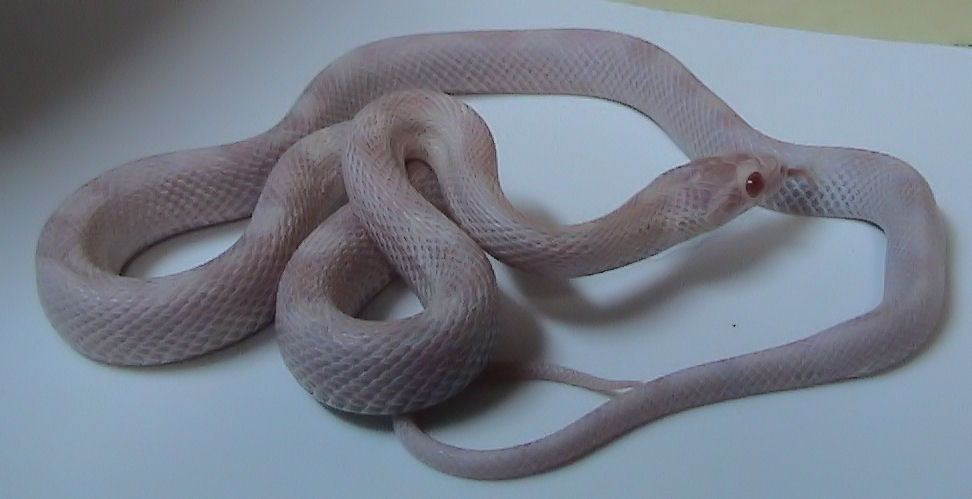
Opal corn snake

- Plasma (Diffused + Lavender) – Hatch out in varying shades of grayish-purple.
- Opal (amelanistic + Lavender) – Look like Blizzard corn snakes once mature, with pink to purple highlights.
- Granite (Diffused + Anerythristic) – Tend to be varying shades of gray as adults, with males often having pink highlights.
- Fire (amelanistic + Diffused) – An albino version of the Diffused morph. These corn snakes are typically very bright red snakes, with very little pattern as adults.

=== Scale mutations ===
- Scaleless corn snakes are homozygous for a recessive mutation of the gene responsible for scale development. While not completely scaleless above, some do have fewer scales than others. However, all of them possess ventral (belly) scales. They can also be produced with any of the aforementioned color morphs. The first Scaleless corn snakes originated from the cross of another North American rat snake species to a corn snake and they are therefore, technically, hybrids. Scaleless mutants of many other snake species have also been documented in the wild.

=== Hybrids ===
Hybrids between corn snakes and any other snake is very common in captivity, but rarely occurs in the wild. Hybrids within the genera Pantherophis, Lampropeltis, or Pituophis so far have been proven to be completely fertile.

Many different corn snake hybrids are bred in captivity. A few common examples include:

- Jungle corn snakes are hybrids between a corn snake and a California kingsnake (Lampropeltis californiae). These show extreme pattern variations, taking markings from both parents. Although they are hybrids of different genera, they are not sterile.
- Tri-color Jungle corn snakes are hybrids between a Querétaro kingsnake and a corn snake. The color is similar to that of an amelanistic corn snake.
- Creamsicle corn snakes are hybrids between an albino corn snake and a Great Plains rat snake (P. emoryi). The first-generation hybrids are known as "Rootbeers". Breeding these back to each other can produce Creamsicles.
- Turbo corn snakes are hybrids between a corn snake and any Pituophis species.
- Corn snakes hybridized with milk snakes are called a variety of names, depending on the subspecies of milk snake used. For example, a Honduran milk snake × corn snake is called a Cornduran, a Sinaloan milk snake × corn snake is called a Sinacorn and a Pueblan milk snake × corn snake is called a Pueblacorn.
- Brook Korn corn snakes are hybrids between a Brook's kingsnake and a corn snake. Like the jungle corn snake, these hybrids also show extreme pattern variations.

When hybrids of corn snakes are found in the wild, they have usually hybridized with other Pantherophis species whose ranges overlap with corn snakes.

== Diseases ==
In this snake Snake fungal disease (SFD) is caused by Ophidiomyces ophiodiicola.

== Predation ==
Birds of prey and larger snakes, such as North American racers and eastern kingsnakes, will consume corn snakes. Carnivorous mammals may also eat corn snakes.

In Florida (specifically the Lower Keys), corn snakes may be eaten by some growth stage of invasive snakes like Burmese pythons, reticulated pythons, Southern African rock pythons, Central African rock pythons, boa constrictors, yellow anacondas, Bolivian anacondas, dark-spotted anacondas, and green anacondas.
