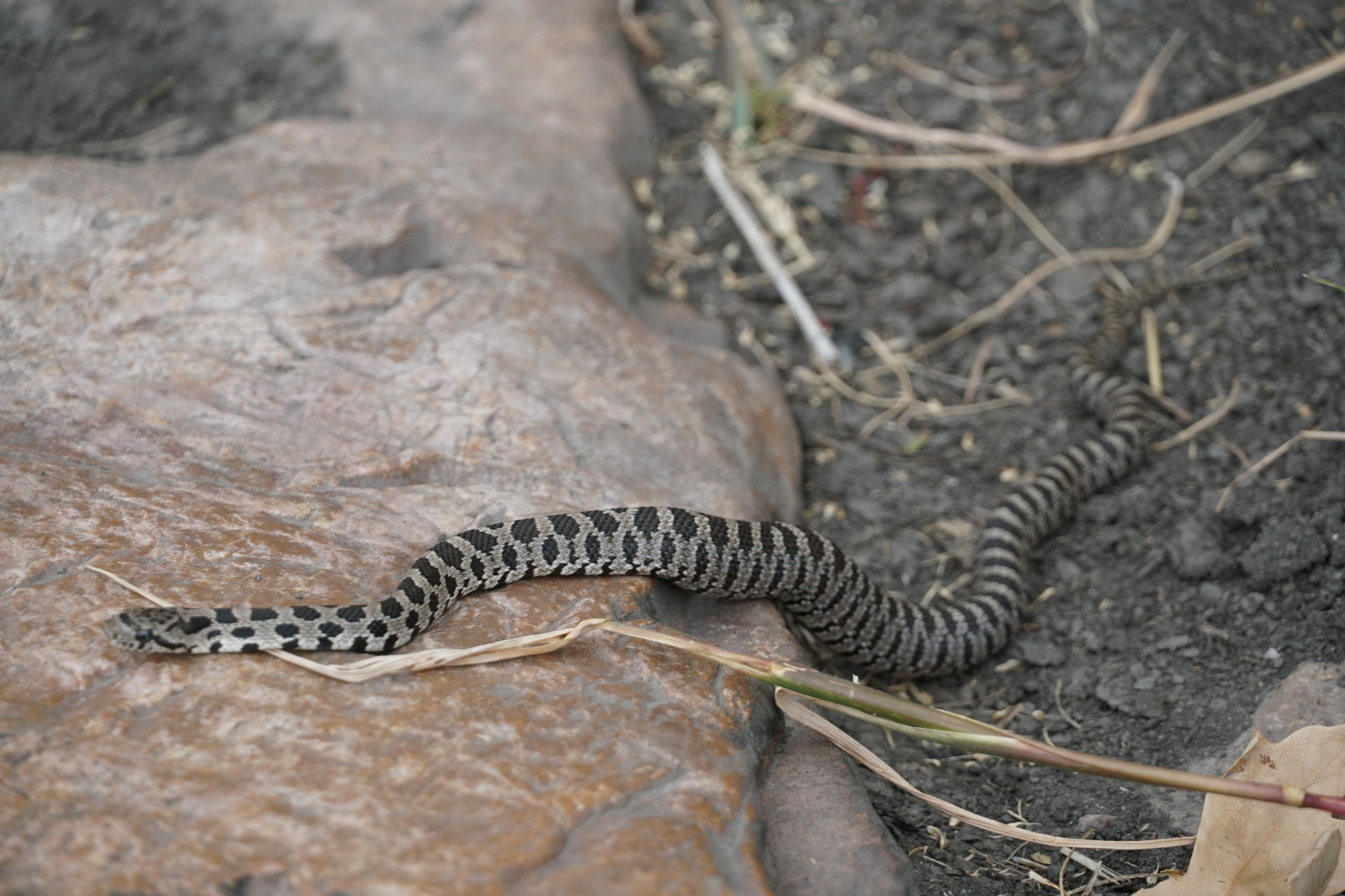

Conservation status
- Least Concern (IUCN 3.1)

Scientific classification
- Kingdom: Animalia
- Phylum: Chordata
- Class: Reptilia
- Order: Squamata
- Suborder: Serpentes
- Family: Colubridae
- Genus: Pantherophis
- Species: P. ramspotti

Binomial name
- Pantherophis ramspotti Crother, White, Savage, Eckstut, Graham & Gardner, 2011

= Pantherophis ramspotti =

Species of snake

Pantherophis ramspotti, commonly known as the western fox snake, is a species of rat snake in the family Colubridae. The species is native to the upper Midwestern United States, west of the Mississippi River. It is nonvenomous.

== Etymology ==
The specific name, ramspotti, is in honor of the late aspiring herpetologist Joseph Ramspott.

== Species status ==
Prior to 2011, when P. ramspotti was proposed as a new species, it was thought to be the same species as P. vulpinus, and P. vulpinus was sometimes called the western fox snake. A 2011 paper by Crother, White, Savage, Eckstut, Graham and Gardner proposed that the Mississippi River be established as the species boundary between two species of fox snakes, and that those found to its east be considered P. vulpinus (including those previously known as P. gloydi) and those found to its west be given the new name P. ramspotti. This proposed that P. vulpinus, which had been known as the western fox snake, become known as the eastern fox snake, and the new P. ramspotti become known as the western fox snake.

== Geographic range ==
P. ramspotti is found in the upper Midwestern United States, west of the Mississippi River.

The range of the closely related Pantherophis vulpinus is east of the Mississippi River. The two species overlap along the eastern side of the Mississippi River, but there is no intergrade zone.

== Habitat ==
P. ramspotti is found in a variety of habitats, both natural and disturbed. Preferred natural habitats include forest, shrubland, grassland, and freshwater wetlands. Disturbed habitats include pastures, old fields, and other farmland.

== Diet ==
Fox snakes are constrictors and primarily feed on mice and other small rodents. They may also consume young rabbits, frogs, and eggs.

== Behavior ==
P. ramspotti is fairly bold and will travel in close proximity to other animals and humans if undisturbed. When confronted, it "rattles" its tail to imitate a rattlesnake and to attempt to deter the perceived threat. It will also go into an "S" position and snap rapidly in succession. These are all defensive maneuvers in an effort to escape.

== Reproduction ==
P. ramspotti is oviparous. Eggs are laid in humus in old stumps and under logs.
