= Chicken snake =

Chicken snake may refer to:

- Pantherophis alleghaniensis, the eastern rat snake, a nonvenomous colubrid found in North America
- Pantherophis guttatus, the corn snake, a nonvenomous colubrid found in North America
- Pantherophis obsoletus, the black rat snake, a nonvenomous colubrid found in North America
- Pantherophis spiloides, the gray rat snake, a nonvenomous colubrid found in North America
- Pituophis m. melanoleucus, the northern pine snake, a nonvenomous colubrid found in North America
- Spilotes pullatus, a colubrid snake endemic to the Neotropics
