= Joseph T. Collins =

American herpetologist

- Born: July 3, 1939; Crooksville, Ohio
- Died: January 14, 2012 (aged 72); St. George Island, Florida
- Education: University of Cincinnati
- Spouse: Suzanne Collins
- Scientific career
- Fields: Herpetology
- Workplaces: University of Kansas Museum of Natural History Sternberg Museum Kansas Biological Survey

Joseph Thomas Collins, Jr. (July 3, 1939, Crooksville, Ohio – January 14, 2012) was an American herpetologist. A graduate of the University of Cincinnati, Collins authored 27 books and over 300 articles on wildlife, of which about 250 were on amphibians and reptiles. He was the founder of the Center for North American Herpetology (CNAH). He died while studying amphibians and reptiles on St. George Island, Florida, on 14 January 2012. "For 60 years I was obsessed with herpetology," Joe Collins claimed.

== Early life ==
Collins recounted his early life in a 1997 interview: He was born to Luvadelle Bernice Collins, a homemaker from Crooksville, Ohio, and a podiatrist, Joseph T. Collins, who graduated from the Cleveland College of Podiatry (now part of Kent State University). He had two brothers, Jerry and Jeffery who were three and 16 years younger, respectively, and both served in the United States Navy. He and his brother were excluded from Boy Scouts for being "too rowdy". (Despite this, in his adult life he was a supporter of the Scouts and served on the Friends of Hidden Valley Girl Scout Board of Directors in Lawrence). He caught his first snake, a queen snake, in a tin can around the age of 10-13. He had an avid interest in animals and collected so many animals, which he and his brothers housed in their backyard, that the City of Cincinnati shut them down for operating a zoo without a license. "You could get anything you wanted in those days," said Collins in regard to kinds of animals. At the time he had saved up $40 to buy an African Lion (price = $50).

== Career ==
He ended up in herpetology after shifting to keeping reptiles because they would fit in their basement. He believed this drove his ultimate interest in herpetology as a discipline. After high school, he attended the University of Cincinnati where he, by his own admission, lacked direction even though he had already started publishing scholarly scientific works at the age of 19. He credited ultimate direction as stemming from his own interests combined with his father's interest in fishing and outdoor activities. In 1967, he was hired as a vertebrate preparator by the University of Kansas Natural History Museum, where he worked for 30 years. He had already been corresponding with other herpetologists across the country. He earned his Associates from the University of Cincinnati, but had no further formal education.

He was among the group of young herpetologists and hobbyists including Kraig Adler (Cornell University) who founded the Ohio Herpetological Society in 1958, which later developed into the largest herpetological society, the Society for the Study of Amphibians and Reptiles under Collins' leadership.

Collins' early books were not aimed at academics; they were aimed at the general public. He served as editor for numerous publications of the KUMNH, and of the Journal of Herpetology. He was a strong opponent of rattlesnake roundups that took place in western Kansas, calling them carnivals, and sponsored a bill in the Kansas Legislature to prohibit importation of non-native venomous snakes into Kansas. His journal articles cover all aspects of herpetology from natural history to systematics. He served as president of the SSAR in 1978, many SSAR committees, acting VP of the Herpetologists League. He was a major influence on many herpetologists including Kelly Irwin (Arkansas Game and Fish, State Herpetologist), Travis W. Taggart (Sternberg Museum of Natural History), and Emily Moriarty, Ph.D. (Florida State University).

He did many benefit auctions for wildlife and environmental groups including the Wichita Audubon Society, Jayhawk Audubon Society, Society for Amphibians and Reptiles, Kansas Wildlife Federation and the Kansas Herpetological Society. After retirement, he served as a consultant for his consulting firm and performed public lectures around the country. At his peak he was giving around 250 lectures a year in Kansas alone. His most famous book is A Field Guide to Reptiles and Amphibians of Eastern and Central North America, Fourth Edition, which he coauthored with Roger Conant.

== Controversy ==
Collins had chaired the committee that produced the SSAR Common and Scientific Names List from 1978 through 1982 with the consensus of the committee. In 1991, Collins released a new third edition to the names list in which he "...unilaterally changed from committee chairperson to author." Then, he published a recommendation for mass changes by elevating 55 allopatric distinctive subspecies to species rank in line with the developing evolutionary species concept. This created widespread controversy and debate among herpetologists, and he was removed as chair after production of the fourth edition in 1997. He continued to publish names lists following this philosophy through the Center for North American Herpetology; whereas, the SSAR continued to publish a list under their appointed committee structure. By 2009 there was serious strife about the conflicting versions of the names list, and Herpetologica published a series of SAs approaching the issue. Despite the controversy and debate, the vast majority of changes recommended by Collins were ultimately supported by the molecular evidence.

== Honors and awards ==
Collins received several awards and honors, including:

- The Wildlife Author Laureate of Kansas (1996)
- Kansas Wildlife Federation's Conservationist of the Year (1986)
- Kansas Herpetological Society's Bronze Salamander Award (1989)
- Kansas Wildlife Federation Presidential Award (1997)
- Distinguished Life Member of the Kansas Herpetological Society (1998)

In April 2012 following Collins' death, the Kansas Herpetological Society, of which Collins was a founding member, renamed its scholarly publication from Journal of Kansas Herpetology to Collinsorum in honor of Collins' contributions, and devoted the first newly named issue to remembrances and tributes of him.

A species of chorus frog from the southeastern United States, the Collinses' mountain chorus frog (Pseudacris collinsorum), is named in honor of Collins and his wife. Collins had previously contributed specimens for the paper.

== Selected bibliography ==
- Conant R and JT Collins. 1998. A Field Guide to Reptiles and Amphibians of Eastern and Central North America, Fourth Edition. (The Peterson Field Guide Series).
- Powell R and JT Collins. 2012. Key to the herpetofauna of the continental United States and Canada: 2nd ed. Revised and Updates.
- Seigel RA and JT Collins. Snakes: Ecology and Behavior.
- Collins JT and SL Collins. 1995. An illustrated guide to endangered or threatened species in Kansas.
- Collins JT and SL Collins. 1991. Kansas Wildlife.
- Collins JT, SL Collins, and TW Taggart. 2010. Amphibians, Reptiles, and Turtles in Kansas.
