= Constriction =

Killing method used by various snake species

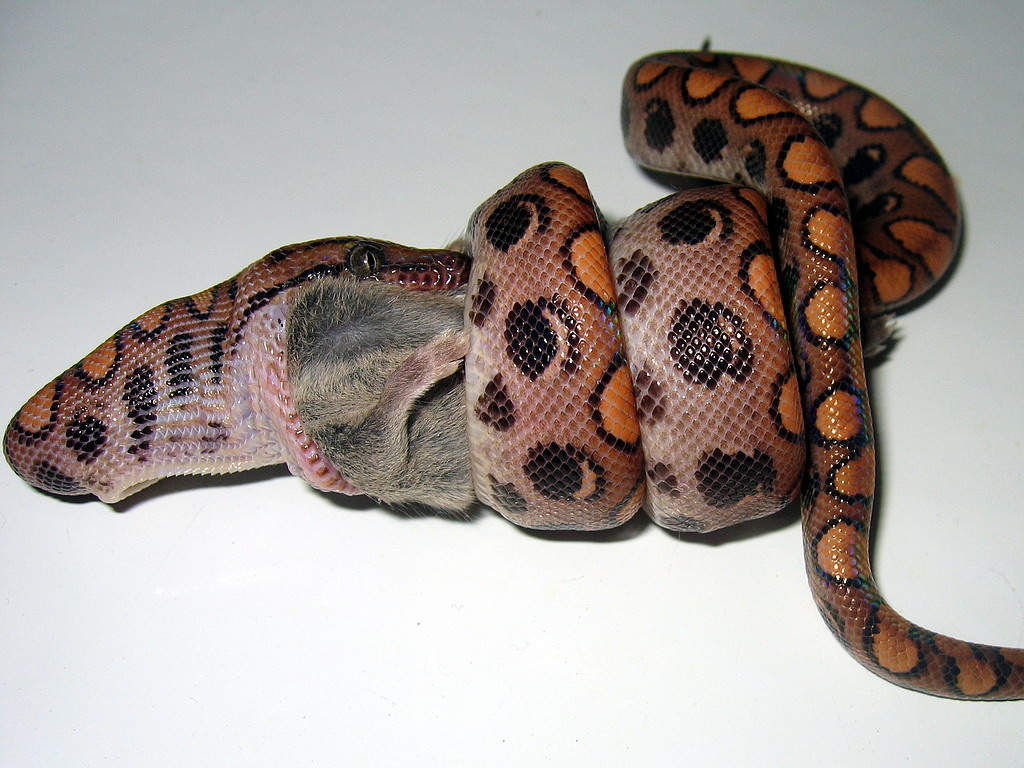

Constriction is a method used by several snake species to kill or subdue their prey. Although some species of venomous and mildly venomous snakes do use constriction to subdue their prey, most snakes which use constriction lack venom. The snake strikes at its prey and holds on, pulling the prey into its coils or, in the case of very large prey, pulling itself onto the prey. The snake then wraps one or two loops around the prey, forming a constriction coil. The snake monitors the prey's heartbeat to ascertain it is dead. This can be a physically demanding and potentially dangerous procedure for the snake, because its metabolism is accelerated up to sevenfold and it becomes vulnerable to attack by another predator.

Contrary to myth, the snake does not generally crush the prey, or break its bones. However, wild anacondas have been observed to cause broken bones in large prey. Also contrary to prior belief, the snake does not suffocate the victim. Instead, a study of boa constrictors showed that constriction halts blood flow and prevents oxygen from reaching vital organs such as the heart and brain, leading to unconsciousness within seconds and cardiac arrest shortly thereafter. Further, multiple species of snakes have been shown to constrict with pressures higher than those needed to induce cardiac arrest. In conjunction with observations of oral and nasal hemorrhaging in prey, constriction pressures are also thought to interfere with neural processing by forcing blood towards the brain. In other words, constriction can work by different mechanisms at varying pressures. It likely interferes with breathing at low pressures, can interrupt blood flow and overwhelm the prey's usual blood pressure and circulation at moderate pressures, and can interfere with neural processing and damage tissues at high pressures.

During constriction when the prey's heart is impeded, arterial pressure drops while venous pressure increases, and blood vessels begin to close. The heart is not strong enough to pump against the pressure and blood flow stops. Internal organs with high metabolic rates, including the brain, liver, and heart, begin to stop functioning and die due to ischemia, a loss of oxygen and glucose. There is evidence that boa constrictors have more difficulty killing ectotherms—animals like lizards and snakes that rely on external heat to regulate their body temperatures. A boa constrictor was observed attacking a spinytail iguana for an hour, and the iguana survived.

This relatively recent research (2015) suggests that other constrictors may kill in other ways. It had previously been accepted that constrictors used their body to hold the prey tight enough to prevent it from breathing, resulting in death from asphyxia, or that the pressure of constriction increases the pressure inside the prey's body higher than the heart can counteract, resulting in cardiac arrest; data from earlier studies had also indicated that snakes can exert enough pressure for these to be plausible.

Certain groups of snakes have characteristic patterns of constriction, including the number of coils they use and the orientation of the coils. The taxonomic name Constrictores, which encompasses boas, pythons and their closest relatives, in fact derives from this common method of killing prey in that group.

Venomous snakes that also use constriction include the genus Clelia (ophiophagous South American mildly venomous rear-fanged colubrids which use constriction to subdue snakes including pit vipers), the western terrestrial garter snake (North American colubrid which is an inefficient constrictor and, like most Thamnophis garter snakes, mildly venomous), some species of Boiga snakes (Asian and Australian rear-fanged colubrids) including the brown tree snake (Boiga irregularis), some species of Australian elapids (including some of the venomous Pseudonaja brown snakes and one Australian coral snake Simoselaps), and a few Australian colubrids.

== See also ==
- Boidae
- Pythonidae
