= Social immunity =

Antiparasite defence mounted for the benefit of individuals other than the actor

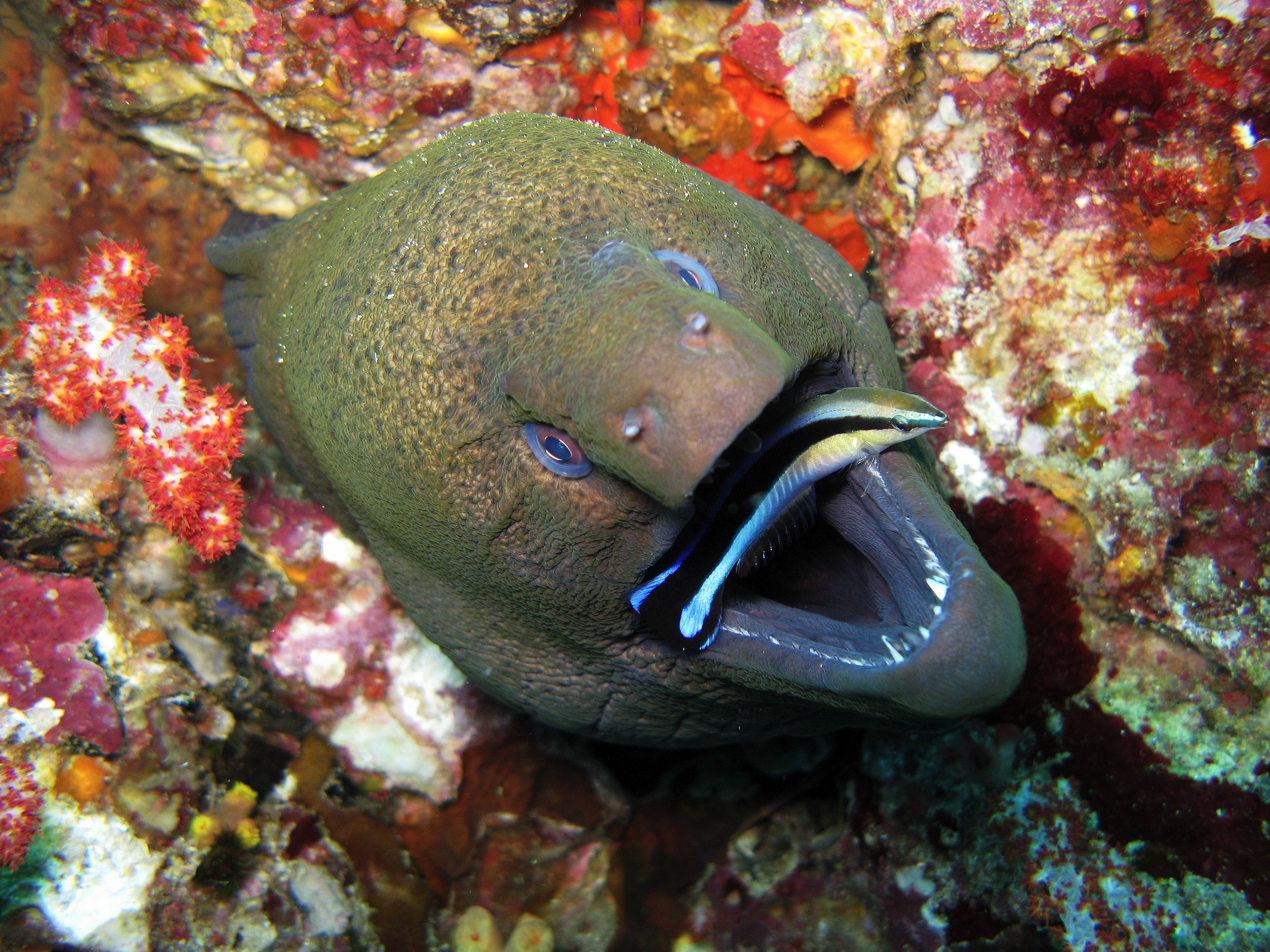
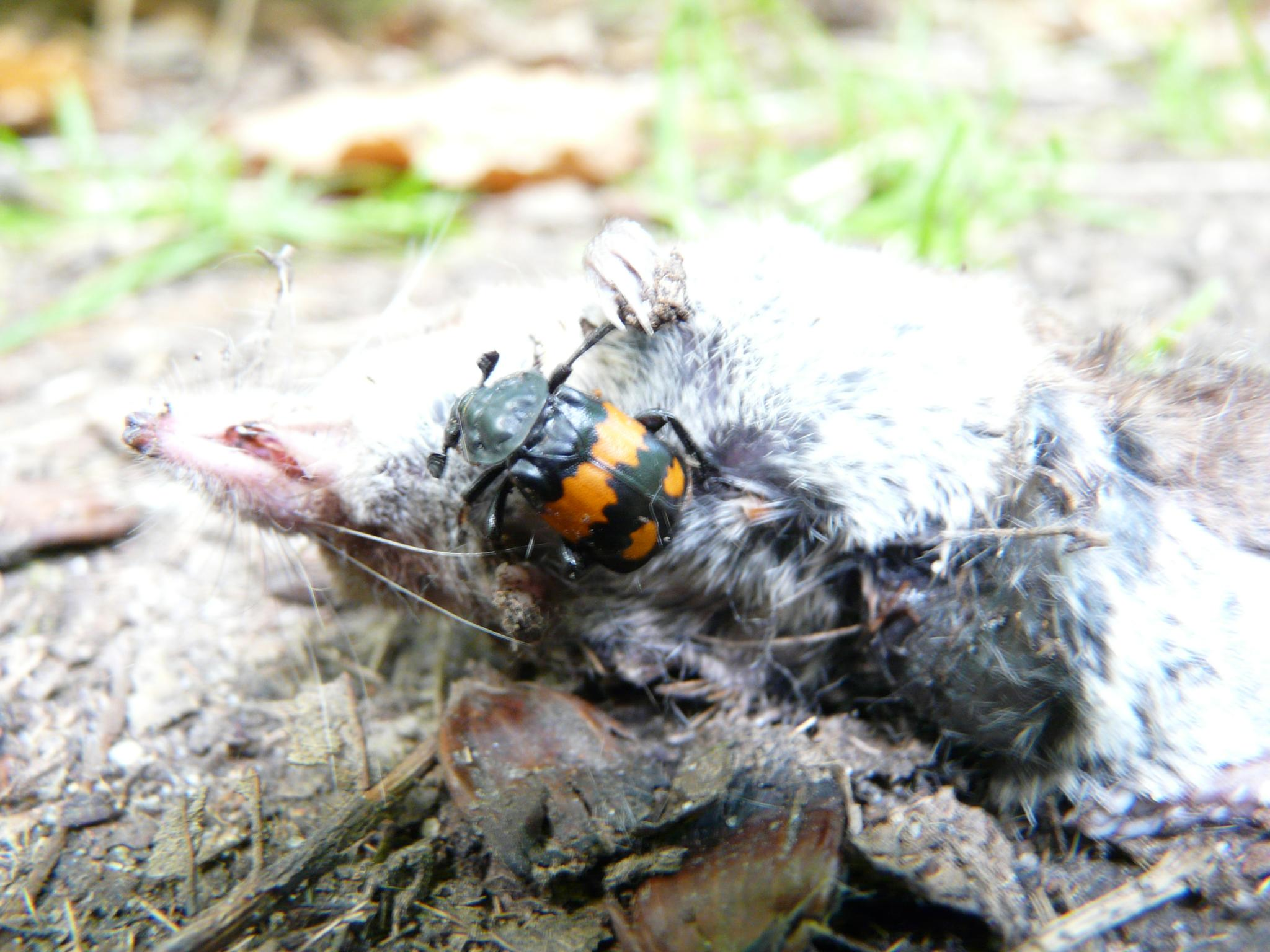
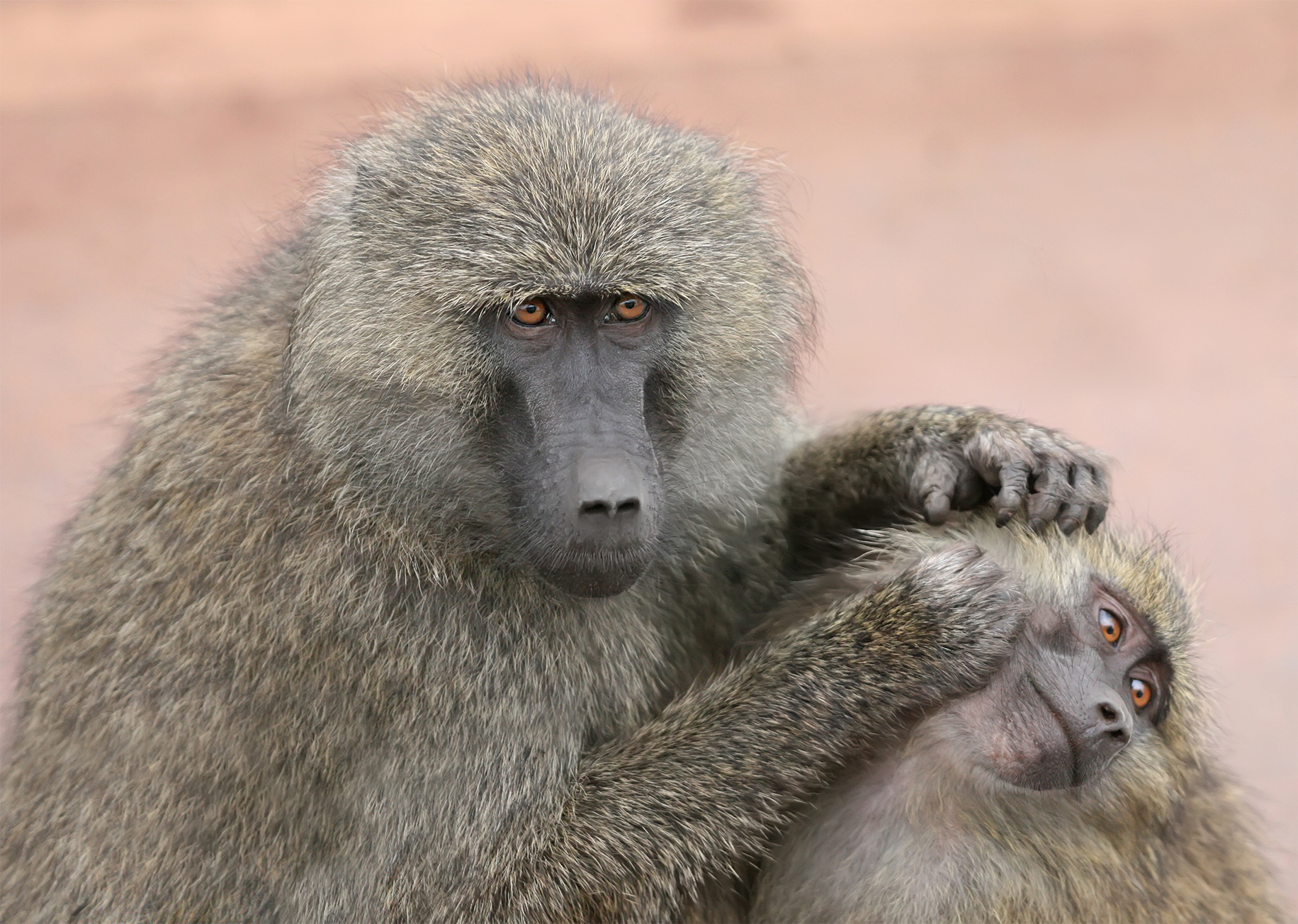
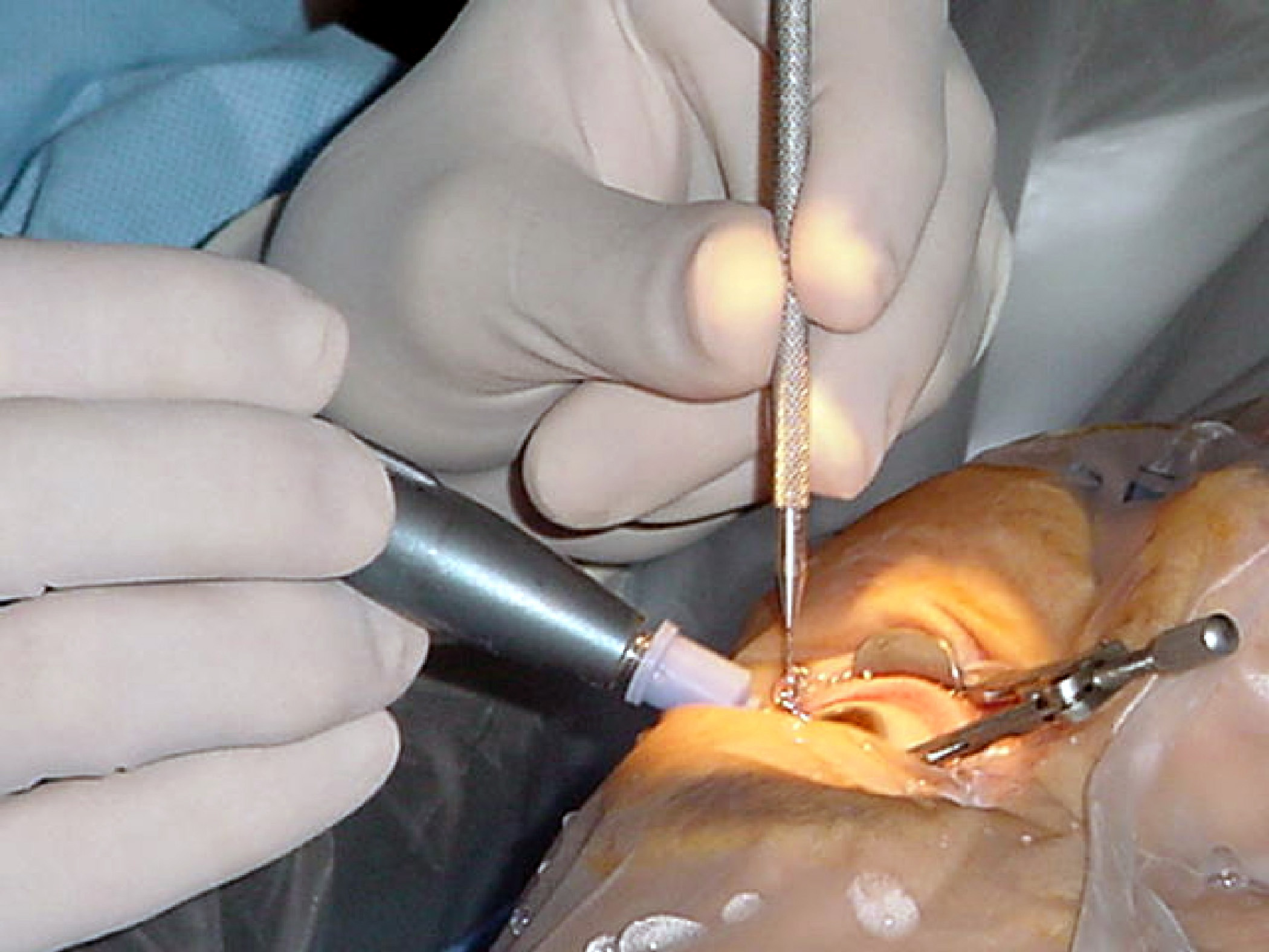
Social immunity adaptations are found in numerous branches of the tree of life, from microbes to humans
- top: A giant moray eel being cleaned by a cleaner fish and a burying beetle begins to prepare a carcass
- bottom: An adult olive baboon allogrooming and a doctor performing surgery

Social immunity is any antiparasite defence mounted for the benefit of individuals other than the actor. For parasites, the frequent contact, high population density and low genetic variability makes social groups of organisms a promising target for infection: this has driven the evolution of collective and cooperative anti-parasite mechanisms that both prevent the establishment of and reduce the damage of diseases among group members. Social immune mechanisms range from the prophylactic, such as burying beetles smearing their carcasses with antimicrobials or termites fumigating their nests with naphthalene, to the active defenses seen in the imprisoning of parasitic beetles by honeybees or by the miniature 'hitchhiking' leafcutter ants which travel on larger worker's leaves to fight off parasitoid flies. Whilst many specific social immune mechanisms had been studied in relative isolation (e.g. the "collective medication" of wood ants), it was not until Sylvia Cremer et al.'s 2007 paper "Social Immunity" that the topic was seriously considered. Empirical and theoretical work in social immunity continues to reveal not only new mechanisms of protection but also implications for understanding of the evolution of group living and polyandry.

Social immunity (also termed collective immunity) describes the additional level of disease protection arising in social groups from collective disease defences, performed either jointly or towards one another. These collective defences complement the individual immunity of all group members and constitute an extra layer of protection at the group level, combining behavioural, physiological and organisational adaptations. These defences can be employed either prophylactically or on demand.

== Definition ==
Grooming is a key social immune defence. Here, Lasius neglectus ants groom a pathogen-exposed (red colour mark) ant to remove infectious stages of the fungus Metarhizium from its body surface, thereby reducing its risk of infection.

Sylvia Cremer defined social immunity in her seminal 2007 Current Biology paper "Social Immunity" as the "collective action or altruistic behaviours of infected individuals that benefit the colony". She laid out a conceptual framework for the topic using examples from primates and eusocial insects. Cremer's definition focused on the collective benefits of behaviours and was adopted by other behavioural ecologists (e.g. Wilson-Rich 2009) when describing immune phenomena which were contingent on the action of multiple individuals. Cremer went on to develop a series of comparisons between personal and social immune systems—she explained that her definition of social immunity encompassed "the nature of these defences that they cannot be performed efficiently by single individuals, but depend strictly on the cooperation of at least two individuals". However, in 2010, Sheena Cotter and Rebecca Kilner proposed to widen the definition of social immunity to "any type of immune response that has been selected to increase the fitness of the challenged individual and one or more recipients", and recommended that the phenomena described by Cremer be known as collective immunity. This definition places importance on the evolutionary origin of behaviours rather than on their functional role at present; Cotter and Kilner explained that their broader definition would include immune behaviours in both animal families and social microbes as well as situations where herd immunity exists due to investment in personal immunity, arguing that this allowed for investigations of the evolution of social immunity to have a "greater depth than would otherwise be possible". They further suggested that the evolution of social immunity be seen as one of the major transitions in evolution. Joël Meunier proposed a further redefinition in his 2015 paper on the role of social immunity in the evolution of group living, suggesting that Cotter and Kilner's definition could problematically encompass immune defences which arise not due to social life but due to shared location; Meunier defines a social immune system as "any collective and personal mechanism that has emerged and/or is maintained at least partly due to the anti-parasite defence it provides to other group members".

== Mechanisms ==
Upon exposure to a parasite, group members must both evaluate the threat it poses and the current level of colony infection in order to respond appropriately. Mechanisms of social immunity are often categorized by the stage of the parasite attack on a group of organisms they target. Some mechanisms are prophylactic (e.g. burying beetles smearing their carcasses with antimicrobials or termites fumigating their nests with naphthalene) whilst others are activated in response to a parasite challenge (e.g. imprisoning of parasitic beetles by honeybees or by the miniature 'hitchhiking' leafcutter ants who travel on larger workers' leaves to fight off parasitoid flies).

=== In insects ===
For a parasite to succeed in infecting multiple members of an insect group, it must complete three key tasks:

- be taken up from the extra-nest environment into the nest
- establish itself within the nest
- multiply and spread to many more insect group members

Mechanisms of social immunity are thus often categorized by which step(s) they hinder and/or block. Levels of sociality across the class Insecta range from eusocial species (with cooperative brood care, overlapping generations within a colony of adults and a division of labour into reproductive and non-reproductive castes) to solitary living, with many intermediate systems in between which despite lacking full eusociality still may exhibit parental care or nest cohabitation. Different systems of social organization alter both the possibility and cost-benefit ratio of social immune mechanisms (e.g. guarding the entrance to the nest requires both division of labour, whilst allogrooming merely requires behavioural interactions), though the absence of many behaviours currently only recorded in eusocial taxa from non-eusocial taxa may simply be due to a lack of study of these group's social immune systems. For instance it seems plausible that insects living in common nest sites could evolve to remove conspecific corpses from the nest or to isolate an infected group member - and yet these behaviours (and many more) have only been recorded in eusocial species. Alternatively it may be the case that whilst the three conditions of eusociality themselves are not prerequisites for the emergence of these behaviours, secondary consequences of eusociality are. Perhaps the large number of individuals in eusocial colonies increases the efficiency of collective anti-parasite defences and thus their emergence begins to be selected for; or perhaps the preponderance of non-reproductive individuals is a necessary driver for the evolution of these behaviours, as when in a colony attacked by a parasite they can only increase their indirect fitness via social immunity directed at the queen's brood.

The lack of collective defences in some eusocial taxa also shows that social immunity may also not always be adaptive (due to life history costs or ineffectiveness against a particular parasite's infective strategy), and that living in a group does not necessitate the expression of any particular suite of social immunity mechanisms. For example, worker termites (Zootermopsiss angusticollis) do not discriminate between infected and uninfected conspecifics, pharaoh ant colonies (Monomorium pharaonis) choose to move into infected nests over uninfected ones and queen wood ants (Formica paralugubris) are not repelled but actually attracted to habitats contaminated with entomopathogenic fungi.

==== Inhibiting parasite uptake into the nest ====
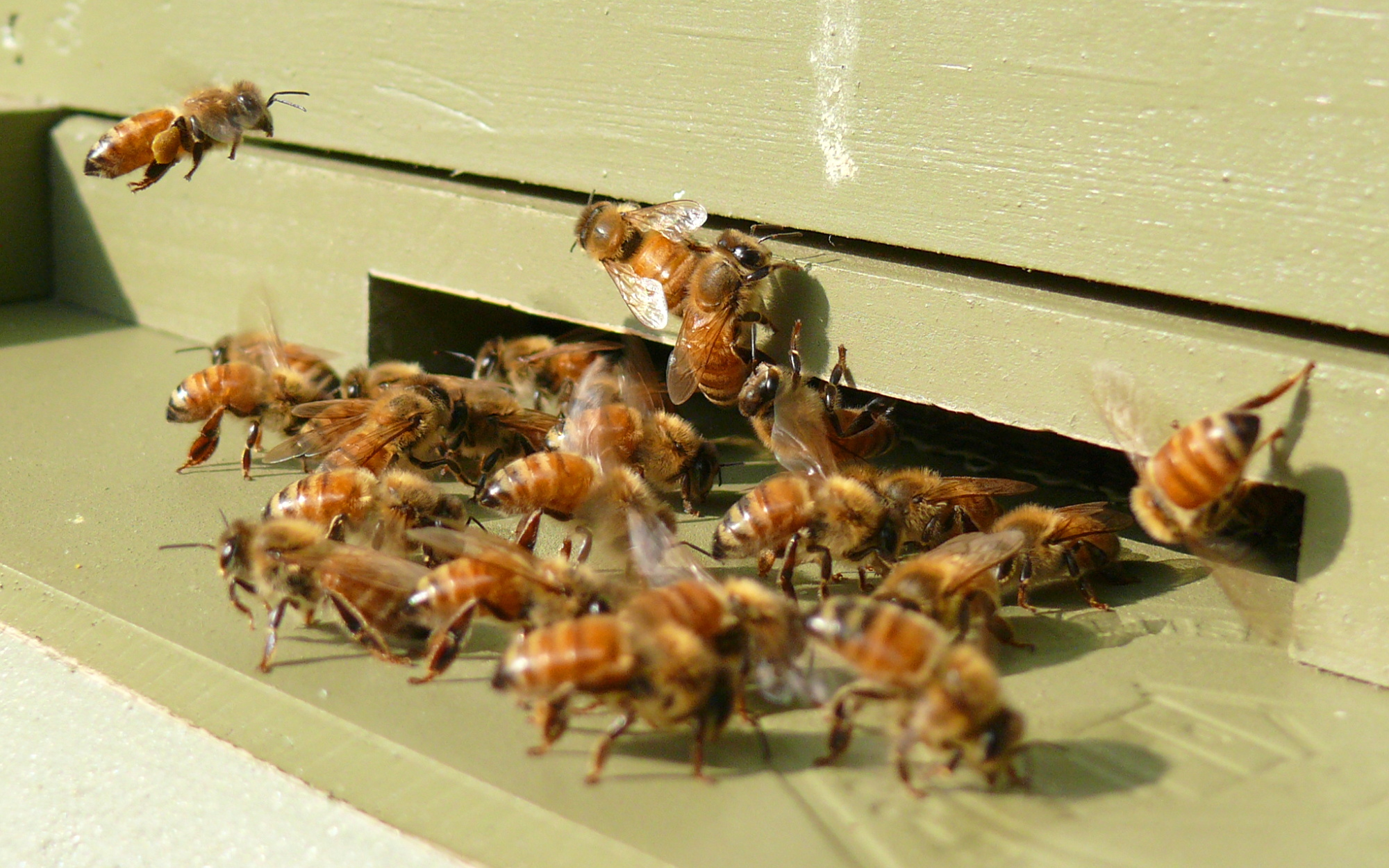
The entrance to a hive of Italian honeybees (Apis mellifera ligustica)—the outward-facing bees are guarding the entrance

A parasite may be passively transported into a nest by a group member or may actively search for the nest; once inside, parasite transmission can be vertical (from mother to daughter colony into the next generation) or horizontally (between/within colonies). In eusocial insects, the most frequent defence against parasite uptake into the nest is to prevent infection during and/or after foraging, and a wide range of active and prophylactic mechanisms have evolved to this end.

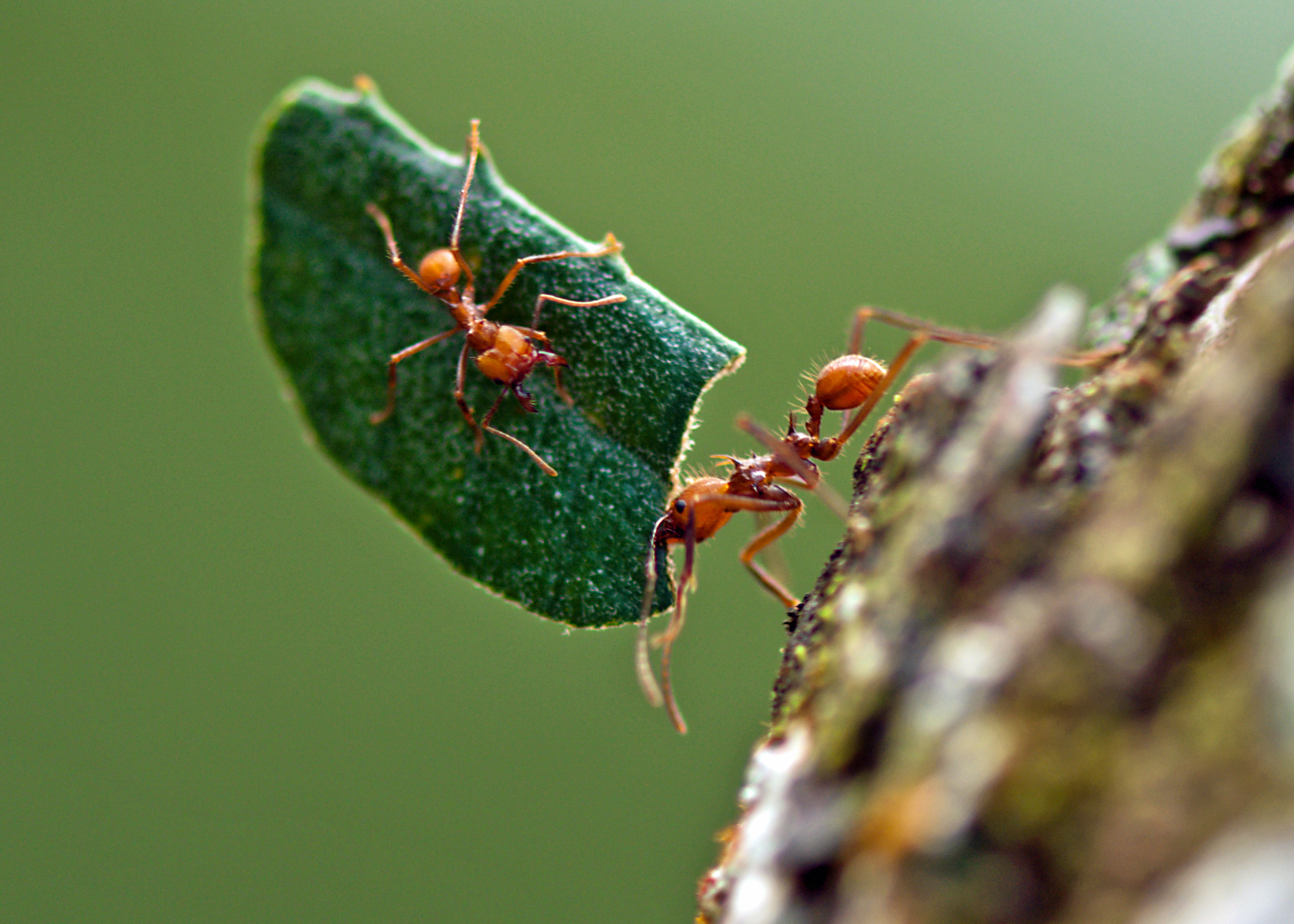
Two leafcutter ants of the genus Atta, one hitchhiking

- Nest guards of honeybees (Apis) guard the nest not just from predators, but from parasites as well— bees infected with hairless-black syndrome are attacked by healthy honeybees which chew vigorously with their mandibles all over the infected bee's exoskeleton. In one study, attacks lasted up to 478 seconds (average of 62 seconds) with overall levels of attack behaviour cycling (highest levels between 12:00 and 16:00 each day, peaking every 4–12 days). Bees infected with chronic bee paralysis are subject to a higher level of aggressive behaviours than intruders or hivemates.
- Workers of the tropical leafcutter ant bringing leaf fragments back to the nest are at risk of attack by parasitiodic phorid flies, who often land on leaf fragments and then proceed to oviposit (egg-lay) into the ant's head. To help combat this, small workers (minims) in at least seven species of Atta hitchhike on the leaves, deterring parasitoid attack. Many possible additional functions of hitchhiking have been proposed, some pertinent to social immunity; evidence exists that the primary function of hitchhiking minims' is actually to inspect and clean the leaf fragments prior to their entry into the colony, removing microbial parasites and contaminants.
- Individual foragers can also avoid picking up parasites by avoiding contaminated habitats, such as the subterranean termite Reticulitermes tibialis which avoids food sources contaminated with the entomogenous nematode Steinernema feltiae. Another termite, Macrotermes michaelseni, avoids the entompathogenic fungi Metarhizium anisopliae and Beauveria bassiana and repellence is positively correlated with the virulence of the particular fungus (very virulent fungi also induce avoidance at some distance away).
- Similarly, individuals can inhibit parasite uptake by refraining from consuming infected conspecifics. Argentine ants (Linepithema humile) and cornfield ants (Lasius alienus) both detect chemical 'ant deterrent factors' adaptively produced by entomopathogenic bacteria and thus avoid infected corpses; R. tibalis does not cannibalize conspecifics infected with M. anisopliae.

Aversion to consuming or coming into contact with contaminated material also exists in presocial species, e.g., the gregarious-phase migratory grasshoppers Melanoplus sanguinipes avoids consuming conspecific corpses infected by entomoparasitic fungi. Female burying beetles (Nicrophorus vespilloides) choose fresh carcasses over microbe-covered degraded ones to breed on - though this may have also evolved to allow a reduction in post-hatching competition between juveniles and microbes over the carcass.

It is currently unclear whether these aversive behaviours evolved and/or are maintained due to social interactions - the increase in direct fitness that avoiding contaminated material confers means that more research is required to tease out the indirect fitness benefits from the direct.

==== Inhibiting the parasite establishing itself within the nest ====
Once a parasite has entered the nest, colonies must now prevent the establishment of the parasite - this is particularly important for long-lived societies which without would accrue a high parasite load. In eusocial insects the most common mechanisms to stop establishment involve sanitising the nest and integrating substances with antimicrobial activity into nest material - nest hygiene behaviours. Examples include:

- In the ant lineage a unique antimicrobial thoracic gland, the metapleural gland, has evolved. Its acidic secretions have antibacterial and antifungal activity are deployed by ants to protect themselves (personal immunity) and other adults, as well as the vulnerable brood and nest substrate. It has been observed in leafcutter ants and weaver ants that broods raised by adults with nonfunctional antimicrobial glands are more susceptible to Metarhizium, furthermore nest material being tended by workers with nonfunctional antimicrobial glands was more likely to be overgrown with fungi. The Formosan subterranean termite (Coptotermes formosanus) fumigates its nest using naphthalene (known to humans as the main ingredient of traditional mothballs) and antiseptic agents to inhibit within-nest parasite growth and establishment, whilst the fecal pellets of the dampwood termite (Zootermopsis angusticollis) immediately decrease the rate of M. anisopliae spore germination when they are deposited in nest chambers and galleries. The wood ant (Formica paralugubris) incorporates solidified conifer resin into its nest (up to 7g of resin per litre of nest material), which inhibits the growth of bacteria and fungi. The terpenes in the conifer resin likely provide the antimicrobial activity, as they do in the antifungal secretions of soldier-caste Nasutitermes termites.
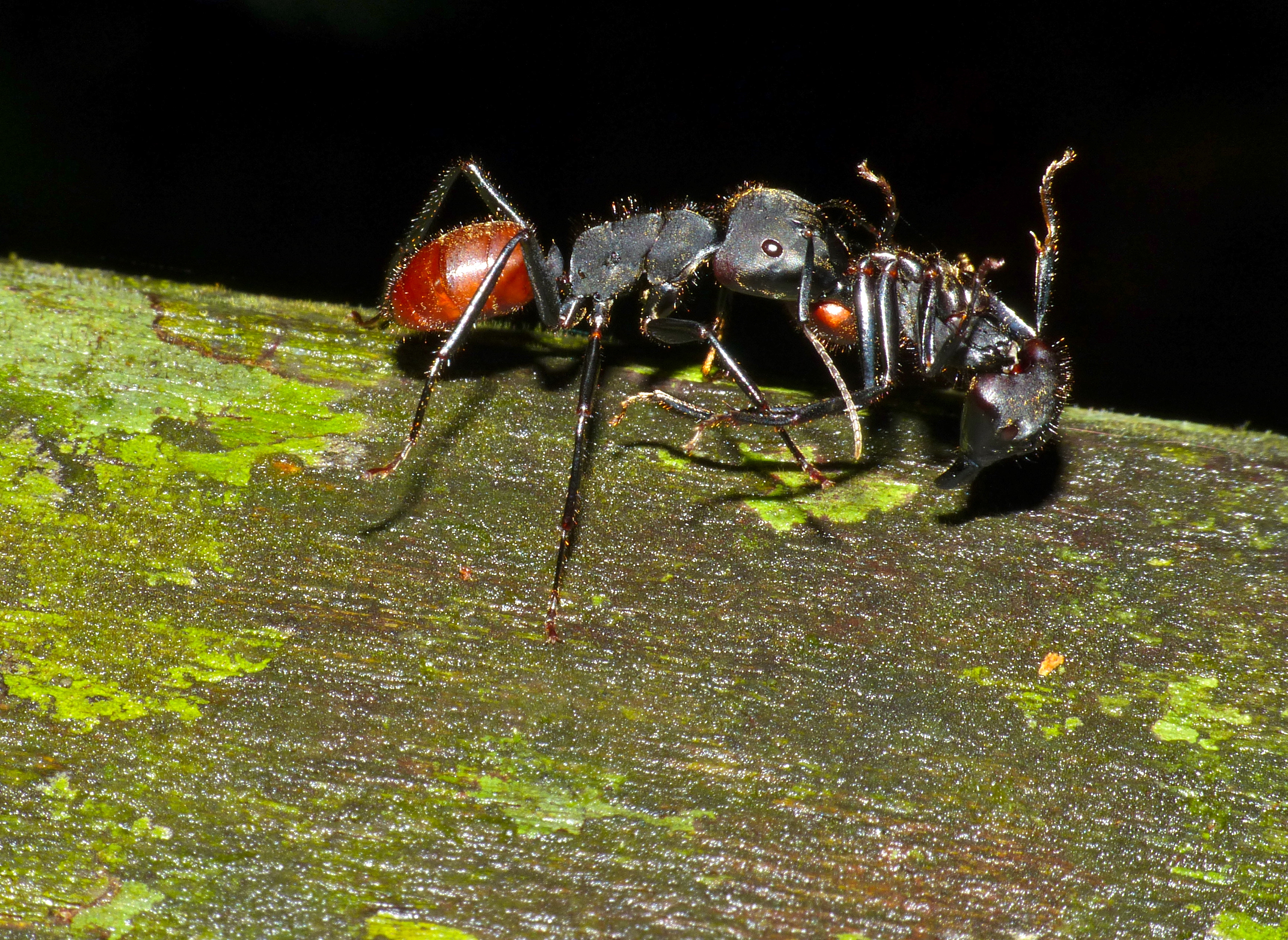
  A giant ant (Camponotus gigas) carrying a dead conspecific
- The corpses of group members killed by an infectious disease present a serious hazard to colony health (as in natural environments death from disease is much more common than death from old age): one mechanism that has evolved to help neutralize this risk is necrophoresis, the removal of corpses from the nest by workers. 'Refuse piles' or 'graveyards' are common features of ant colonies, and workers remove corpses (within the hour after death) to these piles after detecting death signatures in the cuticular hydrocarbon chemistry. Corpse deposition is biased towards downward slopes, which saves the corpse-transporting worker energy as well as preventing any rain washing the corpses back into the colony - necrophoretic behaviours are distinct from ant responses to foreign inanimate objects as corpses are transported further and quicker. By bringing corpses out of the nest the ultraviolet radiation in sunlight can kill emerging fungal spores; Atta transport corpses to special refuse chambers rather than into the external environment. Temnothorax lichtensteini ants remove the corpses of dead sisters as above, but bury newly-dead foreign corpses inside the nest - whilst one or a few individuals 'decide' to transport or bury a corpse, up to 25 workers are then involved in the undertaking of one corpse. Termites commonly bury and cannibalize corpses: when C. formosanus colonies are infected with M. anisopliae, necrophagy is common when the proportion of dead individuals in an area was low (15%), but as mortality increased then so did burying behaviour up to 75%–80% mortality above which carcasses were too numerous for workers to bury and secondary rounds of M. anisopliae infection was possible. Termites do occasionally remove dead from the nest but this is uncommon (leaving the nest at all is rare); refuse chambers or piles/graveyards have not been observed. Research on undertaking behaviours in bees has concentrated on the honeybee (Apis mellifera): 1–2% of a colony are undertaker bees, specialized for corpse removal: they inspect corpses with their antennae before rapidly dropping them from the nest.
- Waste material is removed continuously and deposited in refuse piles as above (or even by some Atta ants into streams). The division of labour in Acromyrmex echinatior leafcutter ants includes individuals who work almost exclusively in waste management: waste material (excreta, food refuse, etc.) frequently harbours Escovopsis (a microfungus that is parasitic on the fungus that A. echinatior tends) as well as other parasites, so spatial separation of waste material from the fungal garden and wider nest environment is of paramount importance. This is achieved by depositing waste material on downhill and downwind piles or in special deep underground refuse chambers. Distinct waste management workers also exist in Atta cephalotes and Atta colombica. The risk of waste-worker ants contaminating the fungal garden/nest is lowered by other ants attacking them if they try to enter the nest, whilst attacks are more frequent in species with internal refuse chambers (this also reinforces the division of labour). On the other hand, some species retain excreta and/or anal exudates within the nest to utilize it for antiparasite purposes: C. formosanus employs its faces as building material for the nest carton, the use of faecal material promotes the growth of Actinomycetota with natural antimicrobial activity (e.g. Streptomyces), combating fungal parasites like M. anisopliae. Colony members of the buff-tailed bumblebee (Bombus terrestris) defend themselves against the virulent Crithidia bombi parasite by consuming beneficial gut bacteria from the faces of conspecific after eclosing.
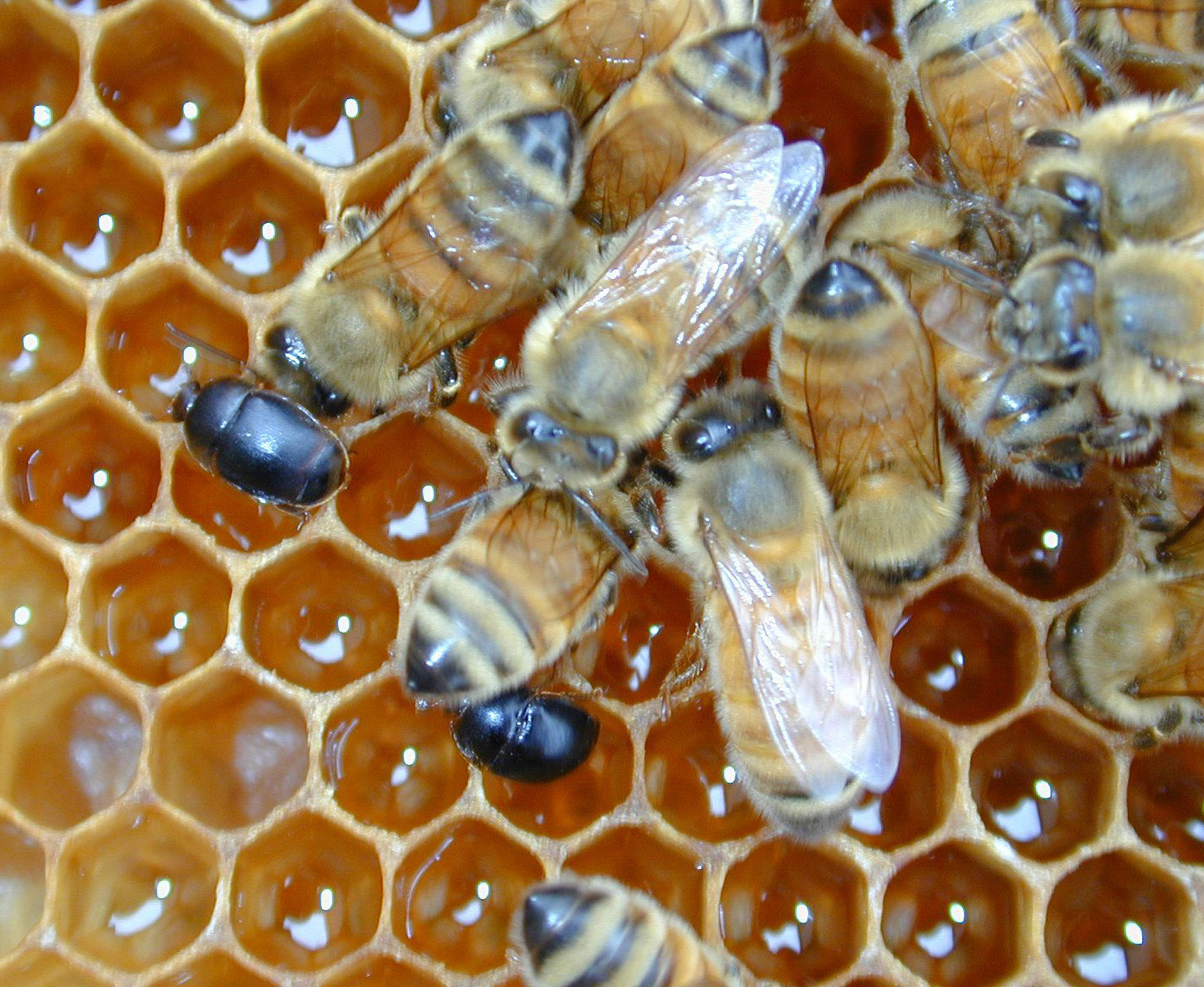
  Small hive beetles inside a bee colony
- Honey bee colonies have also been observed to actively increase resin foraging in response to fungal infection, in a behaviour that may constitute colony-level self-medication. Simone-Finstrom and Spivak (2012) found that colonies challenged with the fungal parasite Ascosphaera apis (chalkbrood) significantly increased their collection of plant resins, and that colonies experimentally enriched with resin showed reduced infection intensities. This resin-based immune behaviour is not limited to pathogen response: in Apis mellifera, a continuous propolis envelope lining the nest has been shown to stabilize immune system function and mitigate pathogen threats more broadly, contributing to social immunity at the colony level. Resin collection has also been documented in A. florea and A. dorsata, though resin use by these species is less well understood. Stingless bees (tribe Meliponini) make even more extensive use of resin, incorporating it into brood comb, honey and pollen storage structures, and nest defences against predators; however, whether resin use in stingless bees directly supports social immunity, as it does in Apis, remains an open question (Borges et al., 2024). Unlike most examples of self-medication, which involve individual animals ingesting compounds, resin-based immunity in bees is distinctive in that resins are incorporated into the nest architecture by adult workers rather than consumed, making the colony itself, rather than the individual, the functional unit of the immune response. Unlike most examples of self-medication, which involve individual animals ingesting compounds, resin-based immunity in bees is distinctive in that resins are incorporated into the nest architecture by adult workers rather than consumed, making the colony itself, rather than the individual, the functional unit of the immune response.
- Workers of the Cape honeybee (Apis mellifera capensis) 'socially encapsulate' the parasitic small hive beetle (Aethina tumida). A. tumida feeds on the brood, pollen and honey, but due to its robust exoskeletal armour and habit of remaining motionless in small gaps (with its head tucked turtle-like underneath its pronotum), honeybee workers find it difficult to decapitate and kill. Instead, workers seal the small hive beetles in using 'bee glue' (propolis). Construction of the 'propolis prisons' by some workers takes 1–4 days but is accompanied by other workers guarding the small hive beetle to prevent it escaping. Guards have been observed remaining day and night for up to 57 days and attacking the small hive beetle if it tried to escape.

Some non-eusocial insects also sanitize their nests: the wood cockroach (Cryptocercus punctulatus) commonly defecates within the nest (this species nests in decaying wood, which often has a high microbe density), and faeces have been found to have antifungal activity against M. anisopliae, possibly mediated by microbes. The galleries constructed within spruce trees by spruce beetles (Dendroctonus rufipennis) are under threat from multiple species of fungus which reduce spruce beetle fitness. Upon fungal invasion, adults begin secreting orally and analysis of these secretions has revealed bacteria with antifungal activity; faecal pellets are used to quarantine off fungally-infested sections of the gallery. A waste management strategy exists in some group living and subsocial species, such as the subsocial De Geer's short-tailed cricket (Anurogryllus muticus). 5–10 minutes after defecating and returning to her eggs, A. muticus females return to the fecal pellets and removes them out of the chamber — note no other items are removed from the chamber. Upon discovering a carcass, subsocial N. vespilloides parents upregulate the antimicrobial activity of their anal exudates and smear them over the carcass - thus sanitizing the resource their brood will soon feast on.

==== Inhibiting intra-group transmission ====
If a parasite has entered the nest and established itself, groups must now mount defences which inhibit the spread of parasites from infected to uninfected group members. The risk of infection for an uninfected individual is dependent on three factors: their susceptibility to the parasite, contact rate between infected and uninfected individuals and the infective ability (virulence) of the parasite. In eusocial insects, defences include:

- Allogrooming, where individuals groom other conspecifics bodies, is an extremely common mechanism of social immunity in eusocial insects. When ants allogroom they rub legs and lick each other clean; any parasites found on the cuticle are stored in a special cavity in the foregut (the infrabuccal cavity, which is found on the ventral surface of the buccal cavity) - this prevents ingestion of the parasite by the groomer. The contents of the infrabuccal cavity are then killed by the chitnolytic activity of labial gland secretions before being expelled as a pellet with other debris to refuse piles in or out of the nest. Upon exposure to M. anisopliae, self-grooming rates of the dampwood termite Z. angusticollis remain constant whilst allogrooming increases by up to 53-fold; allogrooming here may not only remove fungal spores as the saliva applied concomitantly could reduce spore viability, similar to the antibacterial activity of Vespula wasp larvae's saliva. Some honeybee workers become specialized for near-continuous allogrooming.
- Colony-level inhibitory strategies can also create 'organizational immunity'. For example, social insect workers tend to work initially at the centre of the nest, nursing the brood, and as they age adopt tasks closer and closer to the periphery, e.g., foraging. This compartmentalization, termed centrifugal polyethism, means that workers of the same age interact mainly with others of the same age, who are performing the same task in the same spatial compartment: thus if a new disease arises that is transmitted through physical worker-worker contact it is limited to one section of the colony. The spatial structuring of western honey bee colonies (Apis mellifera) privileges young individuals-when colonies are afflicted with diseases that have a short infectious period (the time period during which infected individuals can transmit the disease to susceptible individuals), it is confined only to the older individuals closer to the outside. In the common eastern bumblebee (Bombus impatiens), workers who feed larvae tend to remain near the centre of the nest even when not performing this activity, and the converse is true for workers who forage; 11–13% of workers remain in small zones a particular distance from the nest centre throughout their life. The demographic distribution of a colony can also be utilized for antiparasite purposes: work on Z. angusticollis has shown that not only are there differences to parasite susceptibility between instars but that the demographic constitution of a group significantly affects survivorship (mixed age groups do better than single-age groups). The effect of colony structuring on disease dynamics and social immunity is also analyzed theoretically using mathematical models.

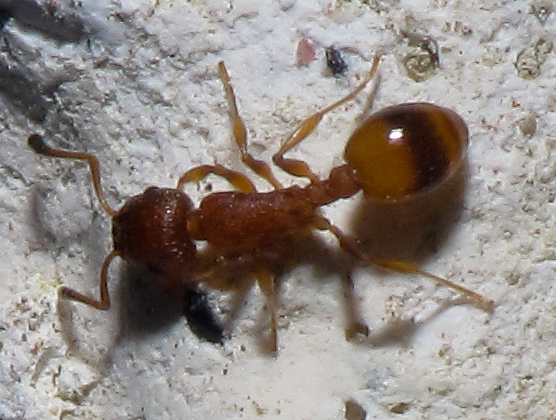
Dying Temnothorax unifasciatus workers voluntarily exclude themselves from the colony and die in solitude

- Social exclusion of infected individuals can also prevent intra-group transmission. When dampwood termites (Z. angusticollis) come into contact with high densities of entamopathogenic fungal spores, they perform a whole-body "vibratory motor display" which induce others who are not in direct contact with the spores to flee, increasing their distance from the infected individual. In the eastern subterranean termite (R. flavipes) infection with the same fungus also causes a vibratory alarm response; termites then aggregate around the infected individual and box it in, preventing it from moving to other areas of the colony; it is sometimes licked and bitten before subsequently being buried. Individual Temnothorax unifasciatus ants who are dying due to fungal infection, carbon dioxide poisoning or 'naturally' (of unknown cause in colonies which had not been experimentally manipulated) permanently leave the nest one to 50 hours before their death, altruistically ceasing all social interactions with nestmates and dying alone away from the colony. Some Apis mellifera workers are 'hygiene specialists'—they detect cells in the colony containing diseased or dead brood, uncap these cells and then remove the cell contents.
- The genetic homogeneity of insect colonies makes them theoretically susceptible to infection en masse; the high similarity of each group members genome means that each is susceptible (and resistant) to the same parasites, whilst experimental manipulation has demonstrated that genetically heterogenous colonies of B. terrestris have lower levels of parasite infection than homogeneous colonies. To increase genetic diversity, colonies can increase the number of queens and/or increase the number of mating partners a queen has— it is thought these social immune benefits may explain the seemingly costly polyandry found in social insect colonies. Social Hymenoptera also have exceptionally high rates of meiotic recombination when compared against a wide range of higher eukaryote taxa which further increases genetic diversity. Ongoing theoretical and empirical work is seeking to tease out the scenarios in which these immune benefits of genetic heterogeneity can be negated due to concomitant costs, e.g., the increased intra-colony conflict and/or susceptibility to an increasing number of parasites which comes with increased genetic diversity.
- To combat heat-sensitive parasites, group members can elevate their temperature collectively—this defence is known as social fever and so far has only been found in honeybees (Apis): upon challenge by chalk brood (Ascosphaera apis), workers increase nest temperature preventatively—it is currently undetermined whether the cue for this action is due to the larvae communicating their infection to the workers or the workers detecting the parasite before symptoms develop.

Allogrooming exists in presocial insects—the European earwig (Forficula auricularia) grooms its eggs to prevent mold growth and wood roach (Cryptocercus) nymphs spend up to a fifth of their time grooming adults (nymphs also groom other nymphs but at a lower frequency, however allogrooming is not seen in adults)— but overall the role of parasite defence in presocial taxa's allogrooming behaviour is currently unresolved.

Nest abandonment is a last resort for a colony overwhelmed by an infection against which the defences listed above have not been effective—infected individuals can then be left deserted in the old nest or expelled from the group whilst the colony travels to a new nest.

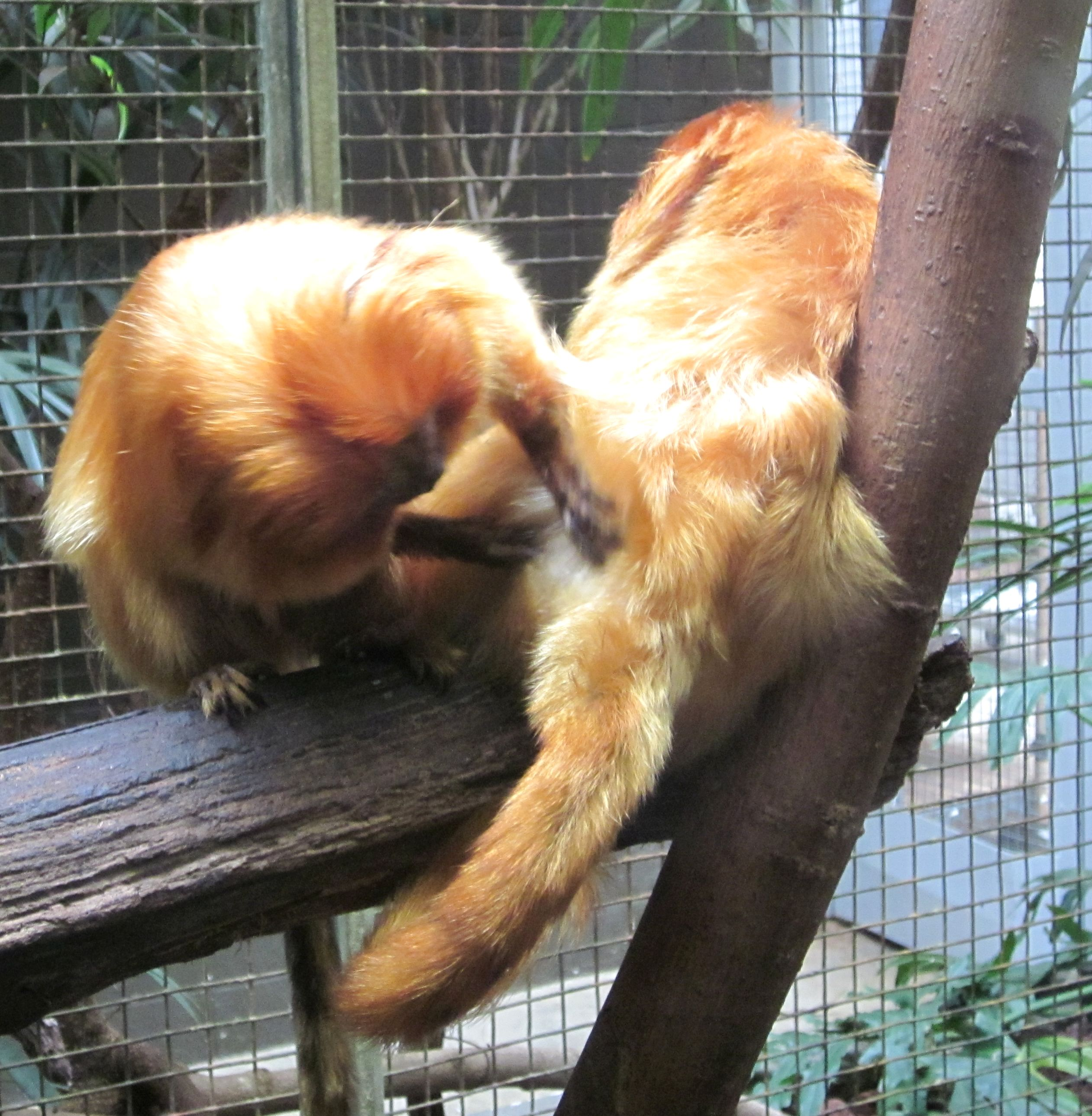
Allogrooming in golden lion tamarins (Leontopithecus rosalia)

=== Other taxa ===
Social immune systems have been observed across a wide range of taxonomic groups. Allogrooming is found in many animals—for example primates frequently groom others, a behaviour which likely evolved for its hygienic function but has now been co-opted for its additional role in social bonding. Allogrooming in the common vampire bat (Desmodus rotundus) is associated with the regurgitation of food and may allow other bats to identify which individuals are capable of supplying them with food; the allogrooming behaviours of horses and birds have also been studied. A range of sometimes elaborate cleaning symbioses also exist between many different species, especially in marine fish with their cleaning stations. Corsican blue tits (Parus caeruleus) prophylactically line their nest with aromatic plants (such as Achillea ligustica, Helichrysum italicum and Lavandula stoechas) to ward off mosquitoes and other blood-sucking ornithophillous (bird-targeting) insects.

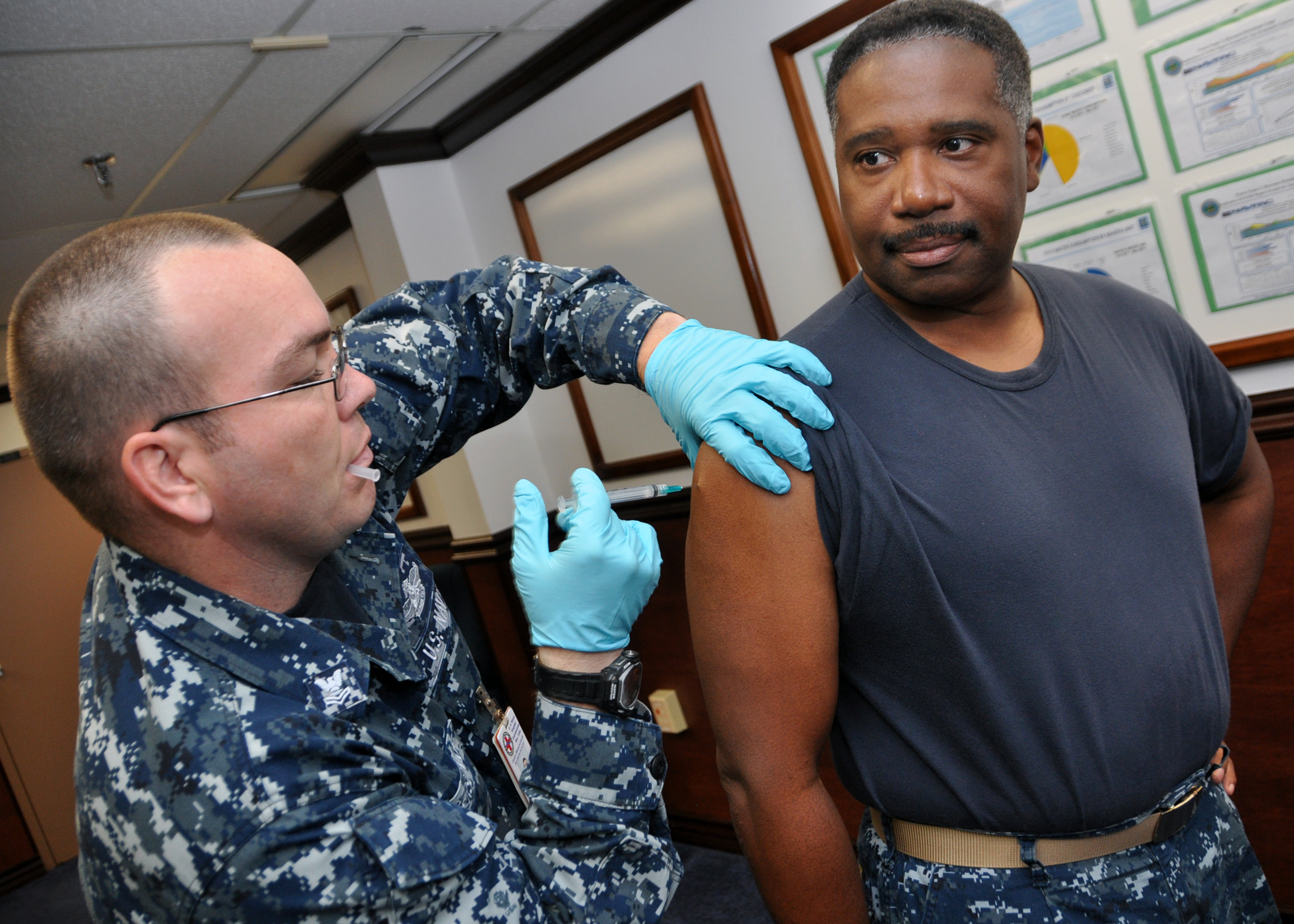
According to Richard Dawkins's concept of the extended phenotype, human healthcare activities, such as vaccination (depicted here) could be seen as social immunity

After the broader definition of social immunity by Cotter and Kilner, numerous examples of social immune behaviours within animal families can be given: túngara frogs (Engystomops pustulosus) create 'foam nests' during breeding in which embryogenesis occurs; these foam nests are imbued with ranaspumin proteins which provide defence against microbial attack and act as a detergent. The three-spined stickleback (Gasterosteus aculeatus), grass goby (Zosterisessor ophiocephalus), fringed darter (Etheostoma crossopterum) and two species of blenny also use chemical strategies to defend their eggs from microbes. Intriguingly, microbes themselves have been found to have social immune systems: when a population of Staphylococcus aureus is infected with gentamicin, some individuals (called small colony variants) begin to respire anaerobically, lowering the pH of the environment and thus conferring resistance to the antibiotic to all other individuals-including those S. aureus individuals who did not switch phenotype. An analogy can be drawn here with the social fever in bees described above: a subset of individuals in a population change their behaviour and in doing so provide population-wide resistance.

Using Richard Dawkins's concept of the extended phenotype, the healthcare systems developed by humans could be seen as a form of social immunity.

== Study species ==
The majority of studies on social immunity have been on eusocial insects. For example, Sylvia Cremer's work uses ants as a model system whilst Rebeca Rosengaus works with termites. Outside of eusocial insects, one emerging model system is the burying beetle Nicrophorus vespilloides.

=== Nicrophorus vespilloides ===
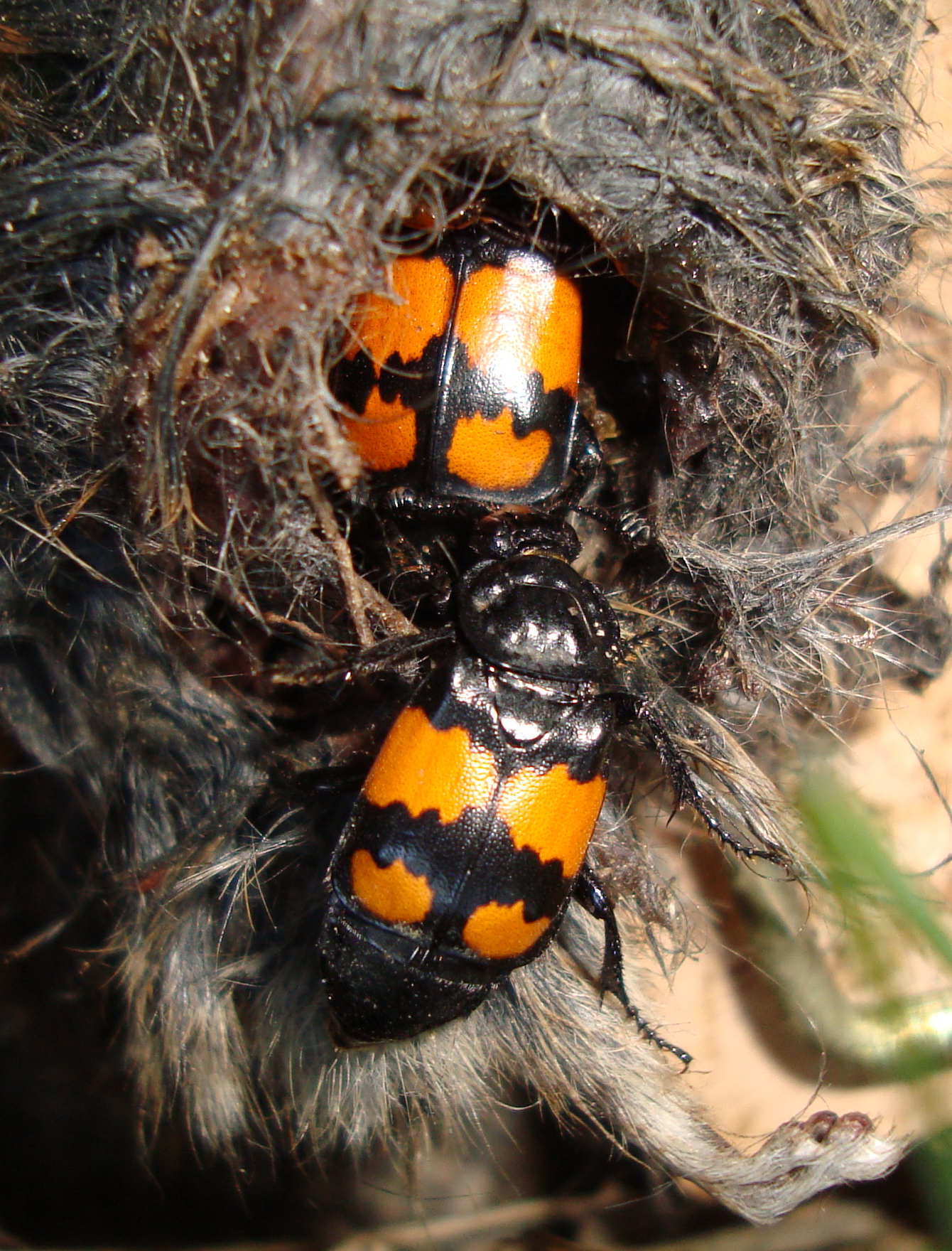
Two N. vespilloides preparing a carcass

Already a model system in evolutionary ecology due to their extensive parental care, burying beetles like N. vespilloides hunt for small vertebrate carcasses which they then bury before intricately preparing it as a resource for its larvae to breed on-these carcasses are scarce and ephemeral yet are necessary for burying beetles' reproductive success. Carcasses are highly contested resources with challenges being launched by other burying beetles and other scavenging species, as well as microbial decomposers. Older carcasses have a higher microbial load and thus have a lower quality as a breeding resource: larvae raised on these carcasses are smaller and in a worse nutritional state–at adulthood these beetles were also smaller, which in N. vespilloides reduces fitness. Daniel Rozen et al. demonstrated in 2008 that N. vespilloides preferentially chooses newer carcasses (which tend to have a lower microbial load) over old carcasses, and if it is not possible to acquire one of these higher quality carcasses that they use pre and post-hatching parental care to reduce the challenge posed by microbes. Sheena Cotter and Rebecca Kilner demonstrated that part of this anti-microbial parental care involved both parents smearing the carcass with antibacterial anal exudates: their 2009 work demonstrated that when beetles encounter a carcass they upregulate the antibacterial activity of their anal exudate by actively altering its composition (lysozyme-like activity increases, phenoloxidase activity decreases), and that the specifics of this social immune system differed between the sexes: female exudate has greater antibacterial activity than males; widowed males increased the antibacterial activity of their exudate whilst a reduction was seen in widowed females.

Cotter et al. went on to show the costliness of this social immune response-by providing females with microbe-infested carcasses, they found that the upregulation of antibacterial activity that followed led to a 16% decrease in lifetime reproductive output. This significant reduction in fitness, due to both increased mortality and age-related dropoff in fecundity, explains why the antibacterial activity of the exudate is only induced and not present constitutively. Further work revealed how a trade-off existed between investment in personal immunity vs investment in social immunity, i.e., upon injury, N. vespilloides upregulates its personal immune response whilst concomitantly reducing its social immune response. Recently, the Kilner Group identified a gene associated with social immunity in N. vespilloides: the expression rate of Lys6, a lysozyme, increases 1,409 times when breeding, and goes from the 5,967th most abundant transcript in the transcriptome of gut tissue to the 14th; it was also demonstrated that expression rates of Lys6 covary with the antibacterial activity of the anal exudate. Social immunity efforts peaks during middle-age, in contrast to efforts in personal immunity increasing or being maintained with age in breeding burying beetles.

The exudate of the larvae themselves also contains antibacterial substances, with activity peaking at hatching and declining as the larvae age. Removing parents results in a downregulation of antibacterial effort, possibly due to the need to invest energy in other more important tasks that arise due to parental absence.

== Evolution ==
=== Comparison with personal immunity ===
Many researchers have noticed marked parallels between the more familiar personal immune systems of individual organisms (e.g. T and B lymphocytes) and the social immune systems described above, and it is generally appreciated among ecological immunologists that rigorous comparative work between these two systems will increase of understanding of the evolution of social immunity. Whilst the specific physiological mechanisms by which immunity is produced differ sharply between the individual and society, it is thought that at a "phenomenological" level the principles of parasite threat and response are similar: parasites must be detected rapidly, responses should differ depending on the parasite in question, spread of the infection must be limited and different components of the individual/society should be afforded different levels of protection depending on their relative fitness contribution. Cremer was the first to do this systematically, and partitioned immunological phenomena into three categories: border defence (intake avoidance), soma defence (avoid establishment within non-reproductive components of an individual/society) and germ-line defence (avoid infection of the reproductive components of an individual/society). Example analogies from Cremer's paper are:

- Border defence:
  - Clotting in an individual's wounded blood vessels can be compared to the entrance-plugging behaviour of special ant workers in response to a parasite attack
  - The circulatory system of an individual can be compared to nutrient distribution in social insect colonies, where a few forage and then distribute it to the rest of the nest
  - Cats and dog self-grooming can be compared to allogrooming
- Soma defence:
  - Granulomas form to contain diseases that individual immune systems are struggling to eliminate; this can be compared to the social encapsulation seen against small hive beetles in honeybees
  - Apoptosis in response to disease can be compared to the killing of infected workers or the enforced suicide seen in Temnothorax
- Germ-line defence:
  - The special protection afforded to reproductive organs (e.g. blood-ovary/blood-testes barrier, increased number of immune cells relative to non-reproductive organs) can be compared to the royal chamber found in social insects, where due to centrifugal polyethism the queen(s), and sometimes king(s), are cared for by young workers who have remained inside the nest their whole life and thus have a lower probability of parasite infection

Other similarities include the immunological memory of the adaptive immune system in vertebrates and the observation that a similar collective memory (operating with a yet-to-be-explained mechanism) occurs in some insect societies e.g. individual Z. angusticollis survive M. anisopliae infections significantly more when they have been in contact with a previously infected conspecific, a 'social transfer of immunity' or 'social vaccination'. Transplant rejection caused by non-self major histocompatibility complexes is frequently thought to be a byproduct with no evolutionary function, however Cremer cites cases (such as the colonial star ascidian (Botryllus schlosseri)) where recognizing foreign cells may have evolved as an adaptation - if so, then this could be analogous to the self-recognition systems in social insects which prevent brood parasitism and the worker policing behaviours which suppress 'social tumours'. Specific immune cells in animals 'patrol' tissues looking for parasites, as do worker-caste individuals in colonies.

Cotter and Kilner argue that not only is social immunity a useful concept to use when studying the major transitions in evolution (see below), that the origin of social immune systems might be considered a major transition itself.

=== Role in the evolution of group living ===
The transition from solitary living to group living (identified by John Maynard Smith as one of the seven major transitions in evolutionary history) brought with it many fitness benefits (increased anti-predator vigilance, foraging benefits etc.) and the opportunity to exploit a vast array of new ecological niches, but group living also has its pitfalls. Numerous studies have demonstrated an increase in contact-transmitted parasite load with group size increase, and thus research has been done on the role of social immunity in the evolution of early group living. Empirical evidence already exists, from both interspecific and intraspecific comparative studies, that an increase in population density drives an increase in personal immune effort (density-dependent prophylaxis). However, there is also good evidence that the evolution of social immunity leads to a trade-off between effort into personal immune responses vs. effort in social immune responses - physiological and genomic studies have shown that social conditions can lead to a reduction in personal immune effort. Personal immunity in the Australian plague locust (Chortoicetes terminifera) decreases upon an increase in population density and increases when artificially isolated. Genomic studies reveal that infected solitary S. gregaria express more genes involved in immunity than infected individuals in the gregarious phase, Bombus terrestris workers also upregulate immune-related genes when experimentally isolated and there are three times more immune-related gene families in solitary insects than in the eusocial honeybees.

Joël Meunier argued that the two seemingly contradictory relationships between personal immune effort and population density were a function of two assumptions implicit in the prediction that there should be a negative correlation between personal immune effort and group living:

1. "Group living is always associated with the expression of social immunity" – this is false; worker termites (Z. angusticollis) do not discriminate between infected and uninfected conspecifics, pharaoh ant colonies (Monomorium pharaonis) choose to move into infected nests over uninfected ones and queen wood ant (Formica paralugubris) are not repelled but actually attracted to habitats contaminated with entamopathogenic fungi.
2. "Social immune responses are costly for producers" – only in one species, Nicrophorus vespilloides, has this assumption been tested - a bacterial challenge to the larval resource led to a social immune response by the mother, and this response did lead to a reduction in lifetime reproductive success (i.e. there was a cost).

Whilst advising that further studies in lots of different eusocial and non-eusocial taxa are required to better assess the validity of these assumptions, Meunier notes that the existence of a trade-off between personal and social immunity could be masked or erroneously 'discovered' in a population/species due to individual variation (e.g. low-quality individuals may not be able to afford relatively high investment into both immune systems), and thus recommends that the intrinsic quality of individuals should be controlled for if valid conclusions are to be drawn.

To assess what current knowledge of social immune systems suggested about whether social immunity was a byproduct or driver of complex group living, Meunier delineated 30 different mechanisms of social immunity found in eusocial insects and looked for counterparts to these in presocial and solitary insects. Supporting the hypothesis that social immunity was a driver and not a by-product of complex group living, ten mechanisms had counterparts in presocial insects and four in solitary species (though this does not imply that some mechanisms may evolve as a byproduct). Evidence that social immunity mechanisms are selected for at least somewhat due to collective benefits is lacking though – possibly due to the difficulty in isolating the immune benefits from the other benefits that social immunity mechanisms often bestow (e.g. allogrooming inhibits the establishment of ectoparasites, but also improves the accuracy of nest mate recognition due to the sharing and thus homogenization of chemical signatures between group members), and the difficulty in experimentally separating direct fitness from indirect fitness, potentiated in eusocial taxa where sterile/non-reproductive individuals predominatee. More studies on presocial taxa would allow for phyletic analyses to recover the actual path of evolution that different mechanisms of social immunity took.

=== Role in the evolution of polyandry ===
The origin of polyandry in nature and its adaptive value is a subject of ongoing controversy in evolutionary biology, partly due to the seemingly numerous costs it places on females - additional energetic and temporal allocation to reproduction, increased risk of predation, increased risk of sexually transmitted diseases and increased risk of physical harm caused by copulation/sexual coercion – for eusocial insects, the effects polyandry has on the colony member's coefficient of relatedness is also important, as reducing the relatedness of workers limits the power of kin selection to maintain the ultracooperative behaviours which are vital to a colonies' success. One hypothesis for the evolution of polyandry draws on the disease resistance that increased genetic diversity supposedly brings for a group, and a growing body of evidence from insect taxa supports this hypothesis, some of it discussed above.

== Concept ==
Levels of [null immunity] in societies. Each group member has its own individual immunity (ellipse) that comprises (i) its physiological immune system, which may involve either only the innate (I) immune component (e.g. as in invertebrates), or also an acquired (A) immune component (e.g. as in vertebrates), and (ii) its anti-parasite behaviours (B, dark grey). In social groups, the additional level of social immunity arises from the collective defences (pale grey, dotted line) of its group members, e.g. mutual sanitary care (arrows; adapted from Cremer & Sixt.).

Social immunity is the evolution of an additional level of immunity in the colonies of eusocial insects (some bees and wasps, all ants and termites). Social immunity includes collective disease defences in other stable societies, including those of primates, and has also been broadened to include other social interactions, such as parental care. It is a recently developed concept.

Schematic depicting the overlapping nature of the different components of collective disease defences.

Social immunity provides an integrated approach for the study of disease dynamics in societies, combining both the behaviour and physiology (including molecular-level processes) of all group members and their social interactions. It thereby links the fields of social evolution and ecological immunology. Social immunity also affects epidemiology, as it can impact both the course of an infection at the individual level, as well as the spread of disease within the group.

Social immunity differs from similar phenomena that can occur in groups that are not truly social (e.g. herding animals). These include (i) density dependent prophylaxis, which is the up regulation of the individual immunity of group members under temporal crowding, and (ii) herd immunity, which is the protection of susceptible individuals in an otherwise immune group, where pathogens are unable to spread due to the high ratio of immune to susceptible hosts. Further, although social immunity can be achieved through behavioural, physiological or organisational defences, these components are not mutually exclusive and often overlap. For example, organisational defences, such as an altered interaction network that influences disease spread, emerge from chemical and behavioural processes.

== Disease risk in social groups ==
Sociality, although a very successful way of life, is thought to increase the per-individual risk of acquiring disease, simply because close contact with conspecifics is a key transmission route for infectious diseases. As social organisms are often densely aggregated and exhibit high levels of interaction, pathogens can more easily spread from infectious to susceptible individuals. The intimate interactions often found in social insects, such as the sharing of food through regurgitation, are further possible routes of pathogen transmission. As the members of social groups are typically closely related, they are more likely to be susceptible to the same pathogens. This effect is compounded when overlapping generations are present (such as in social insect colonies and primate groups), which facilitates the horizontal transmission of pathogens from the older generation to the next. In the case of species that live in nests/burrows, stable, homeostatic temperatures and humidity may create ideal conditions for pathogen growth.

Disease risk is further affected by the ecology. For example, many social insects nest and forage in habitats that are rich in pathogens, such as soil or rotting wood, exposing them to a plethora of microparasites, e.g. fungi, bacteria, viruses and macroparasites, e.g. mites and nematodes. In addition, shared food resources, such as flowers, can act as disease hubs for social insect pollinators, promoting both interspecific and intraspecific pathogen transmission. This may be a contributing factor in the spread of emergent infectious diseases in bees.

All of these factors combined can therefore contribute to rapid disease spread following an outbreak, and, if transmission is not controlled, an epizootic (an animal epidemic) may result. Hence, social immunity has evolved to reduce and mitigate this risk.

== Components of social immunity in insect societies ==
=== Nest hygiene ===
Social insects have evolved an array of sanitary behaviours to keep their nests clean, thereby reducing the probability of parasite establishment and spread within the colony. Such behaviours can be employed either prophylactically, or actively, upon demand. For example, social insects can incorporate materials with antimicrobial properties into their nest, such as conifer resin, or faecal pellets that contain symbiont derived antimicrobials. These materials reduce the growth and density of many detrimental bacteria and fungi. Antimicrobial substances can also be self-produced. Secretions from the metapleural glands of ants and volatile chemical components produced by termites have been shown to inhibit fungal germination and growth. Another important component of nest hygiene is waste management, which involves strict spatial separation of clean nest areas and waste dumps. Social insect colonies often deposit their waste outside of the nest, or in special compartments, including waste chambers for food leftovers, "toilets" for defecation and "graveyards", where dead individuals are deposited, reducing the probability of parasite transmission from potentially infected cadavers. Where social insects place their waste is also important. For example, leaf cutting ants living in xeric conditions deposit their waste outside the nest, whilst species living in the tropics tend to keep it in special chambers within the nest. It has been proposed that this difference is related to the likelihood that the external environment reduces or enhances microbial growth. For xeric-living ants, placing waste outside will tend to inhibit infectious material, as microbes are usually killed under hot, dry conditions. On the other hand, placing waste into warm, humid environments will promote microbial growth and disease transmission, so it may be safer for ants living in the topics to contain their waste within the nest. Honeybees have evolved the ability to actively maintain a constant temperature within their hives to ensure optimal brood development. Upon exposure to Ascoshpaera apis, a heat sensitive fungal pathogen that causes chalk brood, honeybees increase the temperature of the brood combs, thereby creating conditions that disfavour the growth of the pathogen. This "social fever" is performed before symptoms of the disease are expressed and can therefore be viewed as a preventative measure to avoid chalk brood outbreaks in the colony.

=== Sanitary care of group members ===
Social insects conduct grooming to mechanically remove the infectious stages of pathogens (green dots) from the body surface of exposed group members (such as larvae) and apply antimicrobial chemicals, such as their formic acid rich poison, which inhibits pathogen growth.

Sanitary care reduces the risk of infection for group members and can slow the course of disease. For example, grooming is the first line of defence against externally-infected pathogens such as entomopathogenic fungi, whose infectious conidia can be mechanically removed through self- and allogrooming (social grooming) to prevent infection. As conidia of such fungi only loosely attach to the cuticle of the host to begin with, grooming can dramatically reduce the number of infective stages. Although grooming is also performed often in the absence of a pathogen, it is an adaptive response, with both the frequency and duration of grooming (self and allo) increasing when pathogen exposure occurs. In several species of social insect, allogrooming of contaminated workers has been shown to dramatically improve survival, compared to single workers that can only conduct self-grooming.

In the case of ants, pathogens large enough to be removed by grooming are first collected into the infrabuccal pocket (found in the mouth), which prevents the pathogens entering the digestive system. In the pocket, they may be mixed labial gland secretions or with poison the ants have taken up into their mouths. These compounds reduce germination viability, rendering conidia non-infectious when later expelled as an infrabuccal pellet. In the case of termites, pathogens removed during grooming are not filtered out before entering the gut, but are allowed to pass through the digestive tract. Symbiotic microorganisms in the hindgut of the termite are also able to deactivate pathogens, rendering them non-infectious when they are excreted.

In addition to grooming, social insects can apply host- and symbiont-derived antimicrobial compounds to themselves and each other to inhibit pathogen growth or germination. In ants, the application of antimicrobials is often performed in conjunction with grooming, to provide simultaneous mechanical removal and chemical treatment of pathogens. In ants, poison can be taken up into the mouth from the acidopore (the exit of the poison producing gland at the tip of the abdomen), and stored in the mouth, to be redistributed whilst grooming. In the ant Lasius neglectus, the poison produced by the acidopore is composed largely of formic acid (60%), but also contains acetic acid (2%). Inhibition assays of the poison droplet against the fungal pathogen Metarhizium found that the formic acid alone substantially reduces fungal conidia viability, but that all poison components work synergistically to inhibit conidia viability, by as much as 96%.

=== Dealing with infected group members ===
Infected individuals and diseased corpses pose a particular risk for social insects because they can act a source of infection for the rest of the colony. As mentioned above, dead nestmates are typically removed from the nest to reduce the potential risk of disease transmission. Infected or not, ants that are close to death can also voluntarily remove themselves from the colony to limit this risk. Honeybees reduce social interactions with infected nest mates, actively drag them out of the hive, and may bar them from entering at all. "Hygienic behaviour" is the specific removal of infected brood from the colony and has been reported in both honeybees and ants. In honeybees, colonies have been artificially selected to perform this behavior faster. These "hygienic" hives have improved recovery rates following brood infections, as the earlier infected brood is removed, the less likely it is to have become contagious already. Cannibalism of infected nest mates is an effective behaviour in termites, as ingested infectious material is destroyed by antimicrobial enzymes present in their guts. These enzymes function by breaking down the cell walls of pathogenic fungi, for example, and are produced both by the termite itself and their gut microbiota. If there are too many corpses to cannibalise, termites bury them in the nest instead. Like removal in ants and bees, this isolates the corpses to contain the pathogen, but does not prevent their replication. Some fungal pathogens (e.g. Ophiocordyceps, Pandora) manipulate their ant hosts into leaving the nest and climbing plant stems surrounding the colony. There, attached to the stem, they die and rain down new spores onto healthy foragers. To combat these fungi, healthy ants actively search for corpses on plant stems and attempt to remove them before they can release their spores

=== Colony-level immunisation ===
Immunisation is a reduced susceptibility to a parasite upon secondary exposure to the same parasite. The past decade has revealed that immunisation occurs in invertebrates and is active against a wide range of parasites. It occurs in two forms: (i) specific immune priming particular parasite or (ii) a general immune up-regulation that promotes unspecific protection against a broad range of parasites. In any case, the underlying mechanisms of immunisation in invertebrates are still mostly elusive. In social animals, immunisation is not restricted to the level of the individual, but can also occur at the society level, via 'social immunisation'. Social immunisation occurs when some proportion of the group's members are exposed to a parasite, which then leads to the protection of the whole group, upon secondary contact to the same parasite. Social immunisation has been so far described in a dampwood termite-fungus system, a garden ant-fungus system and a carpenter ant–bacterium system. In all cases, social contact with pathogen-exposed individuals promoted reduced susceptibility in their nestmates (increased survival), upon subsequent exposure to the same pathogen. In the ant-fungus and termite-fungus systems, social immunisation was shown to be caused by the transfer of fungal conidia during allogrooming, from the exposed insects to nestmates performing grooming. This contamination resulted in low-level infections of the fungus in the nestmates, which stimulated their immune system, and protected them against subsequent lethal exposures to the same pathogen. This method of immunisation parallels variolation, an early form of human vaccination, which used live pathogens to protect patients against, for example, smallpox

=== Organisational defence ===
The controlled interactions between colony members through spatial, behavioural and temporal segregation, is thought to restrict disease transmission.

Organisational disease defence — or organisational immunity — refers to patterns of social interactions which could, hypothetically, mitigate disease transmission in a social group. As disease transmission occurs through social interactions, changes in the type and frequency of these interactions are expected to modulate disease spread. Organisational immunity is predicted to have both a constitutive and an induced component. The innate, organisational substructure of social insect colonies may provide constitutional protection of the most valuable colony members, the queens and brood, as disease will be contained within subgroups. Social insect colonies are segregated into worker groups that experience different disease hazards, where the young and reproductive individuals interact minimally with the workers performing the tasks with higher disease risk (e.g. foragers). This segregation can arise as a result of the physical properties of the nest or the differences in space usage of the individuals. It can also result from age- or task-biased interactions. Distinct activity patterns between group members (e.g. individuals with relatively higher number of interactions, or high number of interaction partners) has also been hypothesized to influence disease spread. It is further assumed that social insects may further modulate their interaction networks upon disease coming into the colony. However, the organisational immunity hypothesis is currently mainly supported by theoretical models and awaits empirical testing.
