= Ecoimmunology =

Study of the causes of variation in immunity

Ecoimmunology or Ecological Immunology is the study of the causes and consequences of variation in immunity. The field of ecoimmunology seeks to give an ultimate perspective for proximate mechanisms of immunology. This approach places immunology in evolutionary and ecological contexts across all levels of biological organization.

Classical, or mainstream, immunology works hard to control variation (inbred/domestic model organisms, parasite-free environments, etc.) and asks questions about the mechanisms and functionality of the immune system using a reductionist method. While ecoimmunology originated from these fields, it is distinguished by its focus to explain natural variation in immune functions.

Multiple institutes engage in ecoimmunological research, such as the Center for Immunity, Infection, and Evolution at the University of Edinburgh and the Max Planck Institute for Immunoecology and Migration. The US National Science Foundation has funded a Research Coordination Network to bring methodological and conceptual unity to the field of ecoimmunology. The causes and consequences of immune variation have larger implications for public health, conservation, wildlife management, and agriculture.

== History ==
Ecological Immunology is a discipline that uses ecological perspectives to understand variation in immune function. Specifically, to explain how abiotic and biotic factors influence the variation in immune function. Articles began discussing ecological contexts and of immune variation in the 1970s but matured into a discipline in the 1990s. Ecoimmunology is an integrative field that combines approaches from evolutionary biology, ecology, neurobiology, and endocrinology.

=== Seminal papers ===
Seminal papers in the field include Sheldon & Verhulst's which proposed concepts from Life history theory, trade-offs and allocation of resources between competing costly physiological functions, are a cause of variation in immunity One of the field's seminal papers, by Folstad and Karter, was a response to Hamilton and Zuk's famous paper on the handicap hypothesis for sexually selected traits. Folstad and Karter proposed the immunocompetence handicap hypothesis, whereby testosterone acts as a mediator of immunosuppression and thus keeps sexually selected traits honest. Although there is only moderate observational or experimental evidence supporting this claim up until now, the paper itself was one of the first links to be made suggesting a cost to immunity requiring trade-offs between it and other physiological processes.

More recently, ecoimmunology has been the theme of three special issues in peer-reviewed journals, in Philosophical Transactions of the Royal Society B, in Functional Ecology, and in Physiological and Biochemical Zoology (see External links).

== Known factors that influence immune variation ==
=== Intraspecific constraints ===
Organisms allocate energy between competing processes including self-maintenance, reproduction, or growth. Energy availability is limited, and the resources used for one of the competing metabolic tasks (i.e., growth, immune response) cannot be directed towards another. The cost of immunity is central to the understanding of ecoimmunology. Natural selection should favor the optimal immune response that maximizes total lifetime reproductive output. The costs of immunity to parasites occur at the individual and the evolutionary scale. Trade-offs between bodily demands are titrated in relation to the local and social ecology.

==== Innate versus acquired ====
One axis on which these trade-offs occur is the trade-off between innate and acquired immunity. McDade applies a framework that considers three ecological factors that shape life-history trade-offs. The framework suggests that environments with high extrinsic mortality should favor innate immunity or short-term immunity while low extrinsic mortality should allow for a longer time horizon in order to invest in acquired or long-term immunity.

- The availability of nutritional resources
- The intensity of pathogen exposure
- Signals of extrinsic mortality risk

==== Childhood growth ====
Among organisms, in developmental stages, the allocation of energy toward immune function may trade-off with physical growth, particularly in environments characterized by high-pathogen and low resources. In Tsimane children, a 49% reduction in growth was observed in children with mild immune activation.

==== Body size ====
Body size affects the extent to which an organism is exposed to parasites as well as limitations on how organisms can mount an immune response. A meta-analysis across animal taxa found that small animals, disproportionately long-lived for their size, experience the largest costs of immune activation.

==== Reproduction ====
Physiological and behavioral changes during reproduction are known to influence the immune system. Trade-offs occur between bodily maintenance (which includes immune function) and reproduction, as metabolic energy expenditure is increased during pregnancy and lactation. The reproductive system is unique in that its function is to produce offspring while the immune system provides internal protection. Both systems are regulated by chemical signals in response to environmental stimuli and rely on interactions between both systems in order for each to function properly. Increased parasitism in animals during reproductive phases has been well documented, however it is unclear if changes in the immune system are causing this as few studies include measures for both immunity and parasitism. A study of wild red deer on the Isle of Rum, off the coast of Scotland, found that reproducing females had lower antibody levels and higher parasite counts. In humans, life history events such as menarche may be delayed and menopause sped up by infectious disease.

==== Testosterone ====
The Immunocompetence Handicap Hypothesis and similar theories propose that testosterone mediates a trade-off between longevity and reproductive effort in males, prioritizing investment in secondary sexual characteristics such as sexually dimorphic muscle mass. Energetically expensive secondary sexual characteristics, such as skeletal muscle mass, have been shown to predict a relationship between testosterone levels and reproductive effort.

Human males experience muscle mass deterioration during times of immunological and nutritional stress. In humans, studies have reported lower testosterone in males with acute illnesses, including sepsis, surgery and HIV.

A different theoretical model has been proposed for testosterone variability as phenotypic plasticity taking into account behavioral and environmental impacts as well as the role of immune activation on testosterone levels. This model considers the variability we see as a plastic response to environmental stimuli and disease risk in different ecological environments, fundamental shifts between energetic allocations from reproductive to somatic efforts. Within this framework, lowered testosterone in response to injury or illness may be indicative of an adaptive response.

==== Stress and cortisol ====
Stress through the release of stress hormones, such as glucocorticoids, influence immune function. Glucocorticoids, like cortisol stimulates mobilization of glucose when energetic demands are increased. Psychological stress responses that trigger physiological changes in organisms in order to cope with the stress modulate immune responses. Activation of the hypothalamic-pituitary adrenal (HPA) axis is one of the main mechanisms by which the immune system interacts with stress. In animal studies, stressors such as social disruption and restraint stress active HPA axis in mice In both human and animal models, studies have shown that varying times of stress can reactivate latent HSV-1. Stress have been shown to increase ocular shedding of HSV-1 shedding in mice and nasal shedding in bovids. In humans, stress is a predictor of recurrences of herpes simplex virus outbreaks and Epstein-Barr virus.

=== Interactions with parasites ===
==== Host feeding behavior ====
Parasite-altered feeding behaviors have been observed in several species. Most studies conclude that there is a fitness benefit of altering host feeding behavior to either the host or the parasite. The species S.littoralis caterpillar when infected with nucleopolyhedrovirus will self-select a protein-rich diet, which increases its probability of survival.

==== Parasite manipulation ====
Selection is expected to favor parasite manipulation of the host when the host's behavior creates a suboptimal environment for the parasite's fitness. An application of coevolutionary theory would predict sophisticated manipulations of host behavior when host-specificity is high. Manipulation must be distinguished from disruption or dysfunction, as such experiments must demonstrate that parasite-altered behavior has fitness benefits for the parasite and that it is regulated or controlled physiologically by the parasite.

==== Host resistance ====
Self-medication, a form of host resistance, is defined as an individual response to infection through the ingestion or harvesting of non-nutritive compounds or plant materials. This phenomenon has been observed in several species, with the most prominent examples including the ingestion of whole leaves by primate species to reduce nematode infections and the ingestion of secondary plant metabolites by caterpillars and bumblebees. In social insects, behaviors that reduce colony-level parasite loads are termed "social immunity". An example of this, Apis mellifera incorporate plant resins in their nest building as this can reduce the chronic elevation of an immune response at the individual level. High activation of immunity imposes fitness costs both at the individual and colony level, thus social immunity reduced individual and colony level costs.

=== Additional Interactions ===
==== Nutritional stress ====
The upregulation of the immune system incurs significant nutritional costs in the forms of protein and energy. Immune costs are often seen when organisms are in stressful environments such as experiencing nutritional stress. In animal models, fruit flies that were selected for parasitoid resistance showed reduced larval competitiveness only when they were subject to food limitations.

Leptin has been proposed as a mediator of energetic trade-offs, as a potential provider of signal for current energy availability.

==== Microbiome ====
Rapid changes in the gut microbiome occurred during human evolution Because the microbiome is influenced by the host environment, researchers believe that it played a role in facilitating human adaptation to novel environments facilitated through periods of climate change and migration. For instance, commensal microbes influence the host's ability to survive pathogenic exposures through several mechanisms including inter-microbial competition and interaction with the immune system. In humans, the microbiome also contributes to many bodily functions such as nutrient processing and fat regulation.

==== Seasonality ====
Seasonal changes in immunity arise in wildlife populations due to changes in disease threats over time and trade-offs between immune function and other seasonally variable investments such as reproductive efforts. Examples of these costly reproductive efforts include molting, thermoregulation, and migration in birds. Seasonal immunosuppression is seen during long days in summer among reptiles and birds.

==== Temperature stress ====
Temperature stress has been causally linked to declines in immune function in several species including C. elegans, Daphnia magna, and Drosophila melanogaster. Cold stress has been shown to inhibit phagocytosis in macrophages in mice.

=== Population genetics ===
Population genetic characteristics such as population size, mutation frequency, and selective processes are important host-parasite co-evolutionary dynamics and therefore influence the evolution of different aspects of the immune system.

Pathogen stress is a major recent selection pressure in human evolution. Pathogen-driven selection has been supported in allele frequency studies including MHC I and blood group antigens. Gene networks have also been correlated with specific pathogens including helminths.

Studies have shown genes that are differently expressed based on genetic ancestry shape interindividual variation of immune cell responses to viral infections, but most of these effects are cell type-specific. Segments of Neanderthal ancestry genomes introgressed to modern humans are enriched for proteins that interact with viruses suggestive of viral selection pressure throughout evolution.

== Critiques ==
Early studies in ecoimmunology tended to underestimate the complexities of parasite defenses, often relying on one or two immune metrics as an overall indication of anti-pathogen defense capabilities. Many studies involve in vivo laboratory experiments, but there have been recent calls for immunologists to study immune variation more in wild animals in particular. To date, sampling wild populations have shown there is substantial inter-individual immune variation.

Another source of criticism comes from the need for to develop assays that can be utilized across species and be accessible in multiple laboratories due to the fact that ecoimmunologists primarily study non-model organisms.

== Evolutionary implications ==
Ecoimmunology allows for the incorporation of more realistic details of variation in individual immune responses in a population. New research has demonstrated that individual variation in infectiousness follows a highly skewed distribution, with very few individuals being highly infectious. Models that account for heterogeneity, predicted rare more rapidly-spreading epidemics and argued for the use of different types of public health interventions compared to models that assume a normal distribution of variation in infectiousness.

Models of host-pathogen coevolution have shown that the nature of life-history trade-offs can greatly alter the evolution of pathogen virulence and its ability to harm infected hosts.

Recent advances in theoretical modeling have allowed for the increased integration of within-organism processes (such as immune-mediated reduction in pathogen replication) and between organism processes (such as transmission). For example, by modeling both host immune defenses and within-host evolution of the Hepatitis C virus, showed that cross-reactivity of immune responses can be a crucial determinant of the chronicity of infection and the probability of transmission.

== Medical implications ==
One of the most influential contributions of ecoimmunology has been the concept of tolerance which incorporates the cost of infection into measures of immunity. The study of tolerance has implications in human biomedicine, wildlife ecology, and public health. For example, there has been growing interest in the "antibiotic crisis" caused by the increased prevalence of drug-resistant microbes and a decline in the discovery of new antibiotic treatments. A shift in focus to tolerance rather than eradication might provide fruitful avenues for treatments that reduce virulence rather than eliminating parasites.

== See also ==
- Zoonosis
- Immunology
- Migration
- Ecology
- Cross-species transmission
- Emerging infectious disease
- Foodborne illness
- Antibody
- Antigen
- Disease ecology
