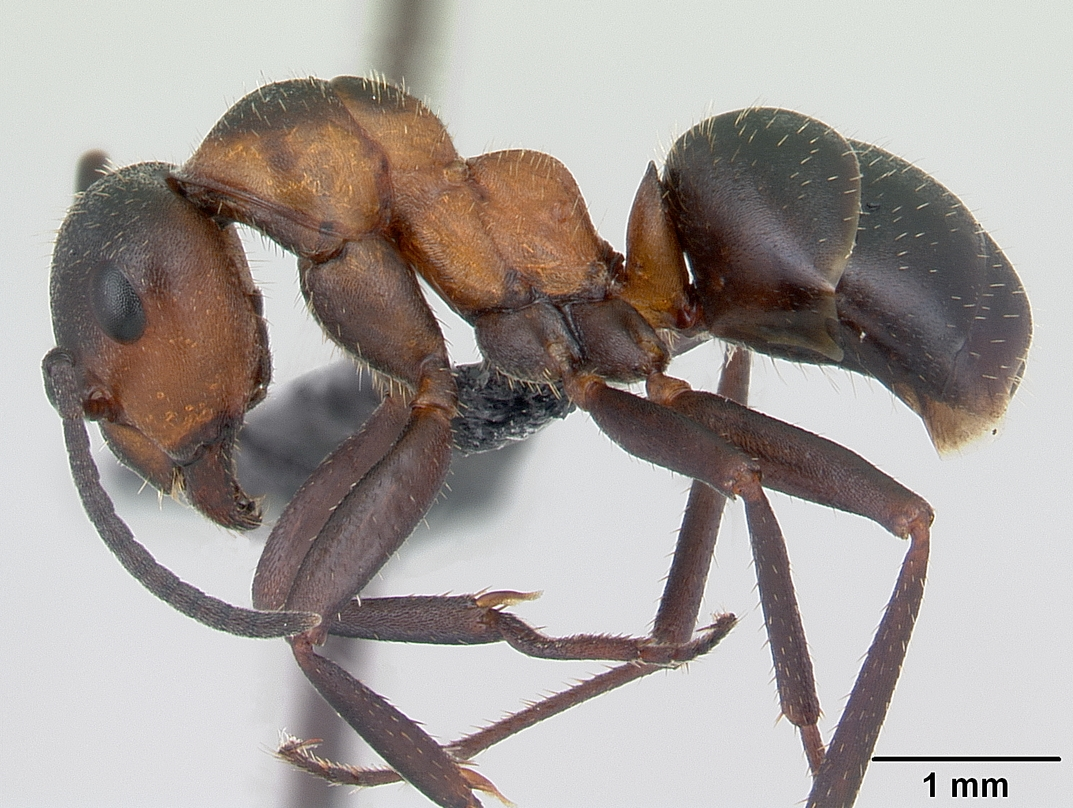
- F. lugubris worker form Russia

Conservation status
- Near Threatened (IUCN 2.3)

Scientific classification
- Kingdom: Animalia
- Phylum: Arthropoda
- Clade: Pancrustacea
- Class: Insecta
- Order: Hymenoptera
- Family: Formicidae
- Subfamily: Formicinae
- Genus: Formica
- Species: F. lugubris

Binomial name
- Formica lugubris Zetterstedt, 1838

= Formica lugubris =

Species of ant

Formica lugubris, also known as the hairy wood ant, is commonly found in wooded upland areas across northern Eurasia. Colonies construct large thatched mound nests occupied by thousands of workers, and one or more queens. Workers look similar to other species of wood ants (genus Formica), but Formica lugubris workers can be identified by a fringe of hairs that reaches down to their eyes and prominent hairs between the facets of their compound eyes. Workers can reach sizes of up to 9 mm long; queens are larger, reaching 12 mm long.

== Behavior ==
Each ant is able to recognize other members of their colony by a specific odor they all carry on them. Different odors allow them to also recognize other insects and ants from other colonies. When these ants encounter members of other ant species, these are usually considered intruders and are seized and dragged into the nest. Combat between ants is common and almost always ends with death of one ant. When red wood ants encounter members of different colonies similar responses may be made, although in populations where nests have multiple queens, there is often very little aggression between members of neighbouring nests. When aggression occurs, the ants are at first startled and enter an upright body position with their mouths open. This is their way of showing threatening behavior. When in contact, members of the same colony are not threatened by each other and do not show signs of aggression. Workers are able to release pheromones that can alert others to danger nearby; this is another way these ants use odors to communicate. These ants typically mate during the month of June. Unmated winged female ants release a pheromone that will attract a male. They will both fly off into the forest and mate on the ground, usually where there are no other worker ants around. Not every ant can reproduce; reproductive males and females are larger than worker ants and have wings. After mating, the male will die and the female will lose her wings and start a new colony. Fertilized queens can take over the colonies of Serviformica ants. The queen lands on a Serviformica ant nest, finds and kills the Serviformica ant queen then takes her place. Her eggs are cared for by the Serviformica ant workers, and wood ant workers will replace them over time.

=== Feeding behaviour ===
Formica lugubris are omnivorous ants that consume a variety of different foods. Red wood ants prey on pestiferous insects and forest defoliators including spruce budworms. As well as invertebrate prey, Formica lugubris collect large quantities of honeydew from sap sucking aphids in trees. This honeydew is a major source of carbohydrate for the adult workers and represents a significant input of carbon into soils in coniferous forests where they live, equivalent to 2-6% of the carbon influx due to needle litterfall.

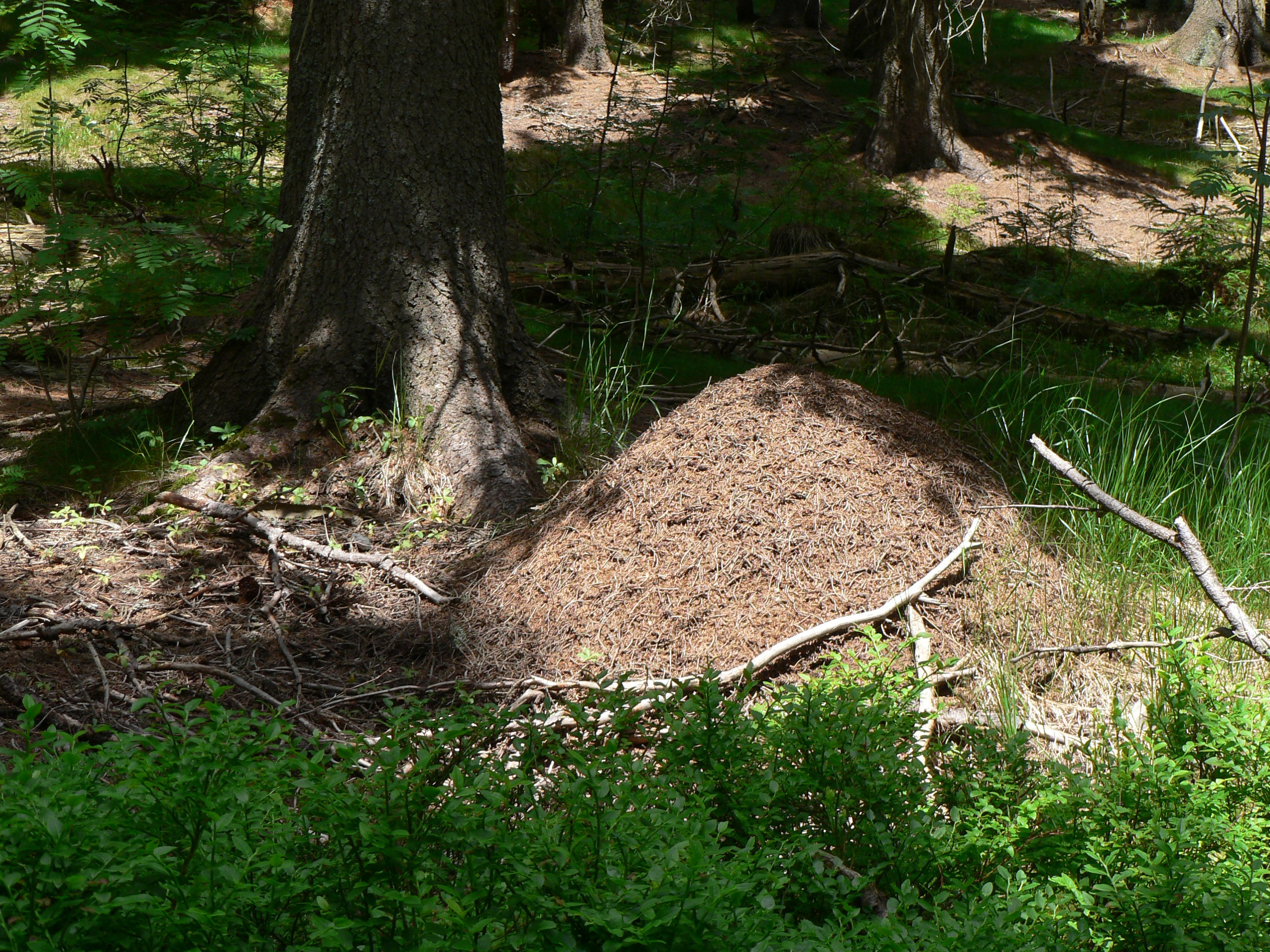
Nest

=== Nests ===
F. lugubris lives in massive nests that can contain up to half a million colony members. They form large, domed nests on southerly facing slopes in relatively open woodland, often along fire-breaks, tracks or in clearings. The nests have several mechanisms for keeping the internal temperature stable. The southerly orientation captures sunlight; the nest is flattened on the south side to present a greater surface area to the sun and in spring, large numbers of workers can be seen sunbathing on the nest. When warm they will go into the nest to release their heat inside. Their nests can also be home to other invertebrates, such as the shining guest ant Formicoxenus nitidulus, which is found only in the nests of F. lugubris and its close relatives.

== Location ==
Hairy wood ants are found primarily in upland conifer and mixed conifer forests, though also in deciduous woodlands. Their range extends throughout Northern Europe and parts of Asia north of the Himalayan-Tibetan barrier. They also occur in mountains further south than their main populations, including the Alps, the Jura and the Pyrenees. Within the British Isles, populations are healthy in the north of England and Scotland, but only a few nests persist in Ireland. A nest of what was previously thought to be Formica lugubris was established near Quebec in 1971 to evaluate its potential as a biological control; however, this population has since been identified as the related species Formica paralugubris.

== Habitat ==
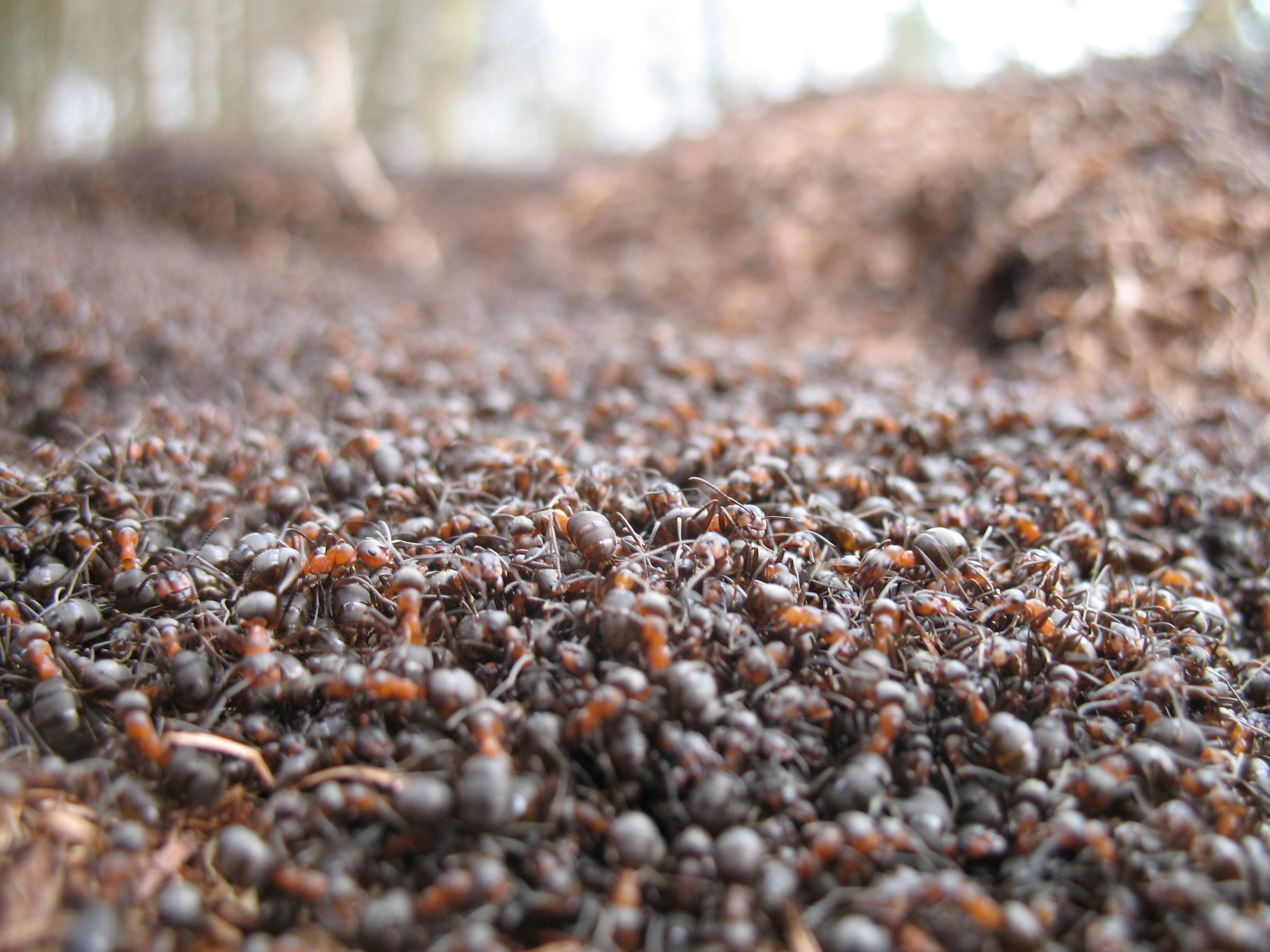
F. lugubris ants

This ant species is an edge specialist, with nests occurring along woodland edges, rides, firebreaks and in clearings. When the woodland canopy becomes too dense, it can shade out the ant nests. As a part of the UK biodiversity action plan, red wood ant preservation attempts are occurring. Colonies can be found in mixed conifer and deciduous woodland, and play a big role in the forest ecosystem. Each colony can reach up about three million ants and live in above ground nests. Nest size can range from as small as 10 cm to over 100 cm in height and up to 192 cm in width. Size of the nest does not necessarily mean the nest is newer. Small nests can continue to thrive for years at a time. Nests are normally located in sunny areas and near woodland rides and glades. In areas where many colonies exist, linked trails can allow a super colony to form. Nests are created are above ground and shaped in a dome. They are made with plant material and soil debris. The majority of the nest is created with organic matter. Although the nests are made above ground, tunnels are created so that ants can reach to depths of 25–30 cm. Ants change the area where they live by re-locating their nest material These nests also provide a home to 43 different species of organisms.

== Threats ==
This ant does not have many natural predators, but its habitat is being destroyed by urban and industrial development. Deforestation and clear felling are very damaging for the species. Another issue is when plants take over an area, which causes loss of sunny areas in the forest where ants create their mounds. Attempts to preserve the red wood ants are a part of the UK biodiversity plan.
