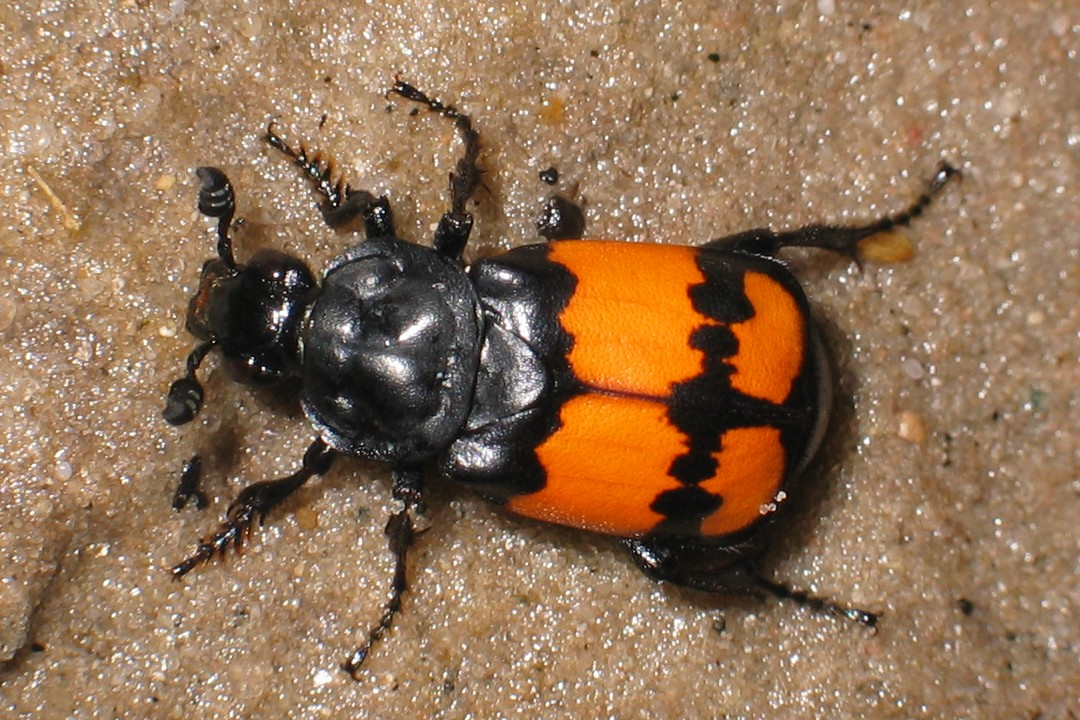

Scientific classification
- Kingdom: Animalia
- Phylum: Arthropoda
- Clade: Pancrustacea
- Class: Insecta
- Order: Coleoptera
- Suborder: Polyphaga
- Infraorder: Staphyliniformia
- Family: Staphylinidae
- Genus: Nicrophorus
- Species: N. vespilloides

Binomial name
- Nicrophorus vespilloides Herbst, 1783

Synonyms
- List: Nicrophorus mortuorum Fabricius, 1792; Necrophorus [sic] hebes Kirby, 1837; Necrophorus [sic] pygmaeus Kirby, 1837; Necrophorus [sic] aurora Motschulsky, 1860; Necrophorus [sic] vespilloides v. Altumi Westhoff, 1881; Necrophorus [sic] vespilloides v. sylvaticus Reitter, 1895; Necrophorus [sic] vespilloides v. sylvivagus Reitter, 1897; Necrophorus [sic] vespilloides v. fractus Portevin, 1914; Necrophorus [sic] vespilloides v. borealis Portevin, 1914; Necrophorus [sic] vespilloides v. subfaciatus Portevin, 1914; Necrophorus [sic] vespilloides v. subinterruptus Pic, 1917; Necrophorus [sic] vespilloides v. borealis Portevin, 1924 (Preocc.)

= Nicrophorus vespilloides =

Species of beetle

Nicrophorus vespilloides is a burying beetle described by Johann Friedrich Wilhelm Herbst in 1783. The beetles vary widely in size and can present with a range of anywhere from 12 mm to 20 mm in size. They have two conspicuous orange-yellow bands on the elytra. The color of the antennae are an important distinguishing feature, being totally black. The color of their orange and black markings is multifunctional, as they are conspicuous to avian predators. In general, they present a unique ecological niche, which is their evolution of aposematism, or the strategy they use to warn predators through their conspicuous signals. The wing cases of these beetles possess a squarish shape and are notably shorter in length than their abdomens, indicating a distinct physical characteristic of the species.

Overall, there are reported differences in coloration and chemical defenses among the sexes. This is hypothesized to stem from conflicting selection pressures for the different sexes. They also produce anal fluid or exudate from their abdomen when they feel threatened. These anal fluids further contribute to the antimicrobial defense of these beetles.

== Geography ==
These insect species boast a wide distribution that spans an extensive range of geographic areas, including the far northern regions of Scandinavia within Europe, to Siberia, and reaching into various parts of Asia, notably China and Japan. Additionally, their geographic range stretches into North America, covering northern parts of the United States and including much of southern Canada.

This broad distribution underscores the beetles' exceptional adaptability and resilience, enabling them to flourish in a diverse array of environmental contexts. They are particularly prevalent in both the Palaearctic and Nearctic biogeographic realms, which is indicative of their ability to adapt and survive under a wide spectrum of environmental conditions. Within the expansive Palaeearctic region, these beetles occupy a wide ecological niche, making their home in environments ranging from the low-lying plains to the higher elevations of alpine regions. They can be found in various habitats that notably encompass dense woodlands, open heathlands, landscaped parklands, and even residential gardens, showcasing their remarkable versatility.

In contrast, within the Nearctic region, their habitat preferences appear to be more selective. Here, they are primarily found in specific types of environments, such as sphagnum bogs, marshy areas, and the fringes of upland regions. This suggests a more specialized adaptive nature to particular environmental conditions prevalent in these parts of North America. This extensive and varied geographical distribution, along with their diverse habitat preferences, highlight the beetles' wide-ranging adaptability and the ecological resilience they exhibit across different regions of the world.

== Description ==
The beetles of N. vespilloides have highly variable body size that ranges from 12–20 mm. They have two conspicuous orange-yellow bands on the elytra. The color of their antennae are completely black. Their orange and black markings serve as a warning sign to avian predators that defends them from attack. Their distinct wing cases are squarish in shape and are shorter than their abdomens. They can fly, especially to locate carcasses.

== Activity ==
The adult beetles are known to follow specific seasonal patterns of activity, which are intricately linked to the cyclical changes in their natural habitats and the current climate that they live in. Typically, these insects emerge from dormancy and become notably active during the spring months, with their activity beginning around spring in early April and May. This period marks the beginning of their most active phase, which continues through the months of spring and summer, extending into the late autumn. Within this active phase, there are particularly significant peaks in activity observed in May, a time when environmental conditions are most favorable for their survival and for engaging in reproductive behaviors. Following this peak, there is a notable resurgence in activity during the late summer months, suggesting a bi-modal pattern of activity. This pattern is not arbitrary but rather is a strategic adaptation to the environmental conditions that are most conducive to their survival and the successful reproduction and nurturing of their offspring.

== Bi-parental care ==
An aspect of the behavioral ecology of these beetles is their commitment to biparental care, where both male and female parents are deeply involved in the care and nurturing of their offspring. This biparental care strategy is characterized by a thoughtful and balanced investment of resources not only towards activities directly related to reproduction, such as egg-laying and the guarding of larvae but also towards maintaining a robust immune function. This dual focus highlights a highly evolved and sophisticated approach to ensuring the survival and well-being of their offspring while, at the same time, preserving the health and vitality of the adult beetles. This approach to parental care is particularly noteworthy as it indicates a level of complex social behavior and cooperation between male and female beetles, contributing significantly to their success as a species. By investing in both their immediate reproductive success and their longer-term health and survival, these beetles demonstrate an adaptive strategy that allows them to thrive across a diverse range of environmental landscapes, underlining the complexity and sophistication of their life strategies in facing the challenges of their ecosystems.

=== Burying behavior ===
Nicrophorus vespilloides shares its reproductive behavior with a sister species Nicrophorus nepalensis. Both species locate vertebrate carcasses and bury them underground to use them as a food source for their offspring. While their respective habitats and ecological niches certainly change the exact mechanism of burying tendencies, both species engage in the general framework of this form of bi-parental care.

== Sister beetle ==
What had been considered Nicrophorus vespilloides in mid and eastern Canada and northeastern USA was determined by Sikes et al. in 2016 to be a separate, overlooked sister species of Nicrophorus vespilloides that had been named by Kirby in 1837. This sister species, Nicrophorus hebes Kirby, is restricted to Sphagnum bogs and marshes. Nicrophorus vespilloides occurs throughout the northern Palearctic, Alaska and northwestern Canada where it is found in open forest habitats. The restriction of its sister species N. hebes to bogs in North America has been attributed to competition with its closely related congener, N. defodiens which in this area is found in forest habitats. N. hebes reproduces exclusively in bogs in North America and is never found in adjacent (<100 m or 330 ft) forested habitat in the Mer Bleue bog area near Ottawa, Ontario, Canada.

== Mites ==
Beetles Nicrophorus vespilloides and Oiceoptoma thoracicum perusing an unidentified small carcass.

There are also a number of phoretic (hitch-hiking) mites that are associated with N. vespilloides. These include Pelzneria nr. crenulata, Macrocheles merderius, and Uroobovella nr. novasimilis and the largest mite Poecilochirus carabi. P. carabi is not attached by any physical means (such as a secreted anal stalk in the case of M. merderius) to N. vespilloides. When the males or females of N. vespilloides have finished breeding on a carcass the deutonymphs of P. carabi roam freely about the body of the beetles as they search for new carcasses to reproduce. It had been proposed that P. carabi deutonymphs, on arrival at a new carcass dismounted from the beetles and consumed fly eggs and larvae which would have competed for the beetle larvae for food. This relationship which benefited the beetles has been described as mutualistic. However, it has been shown that adults of P. carabi consume the eggs of N. vespilloides and that this has direct and negative effects on the reproduction of this beetle species. This is one of the most well studied of the burying beetles with over 1,000 citations found via Google Scholar. N. vespilloides is also used as a model organism in the study of social immunity.

== Reproduction and parental care ==
The reproductive success of burying beetles is intricately linked to their unique ecological niche, specifically their reliance on securing a small vertebrate carcass for breeding purposes. The discovery of such a carcass is a pivotal moment in the beetles' reproductive cycle, triggering a significant increase in juvenile hormone (JH) levels. It's noteworthy that in other species, elevated JH levels have been associated with the suppression of the immune system, hinting at a possible trade-off in burying beetles where there might be a down regulation of the immune response during the critical period of breeding. This adaptation underscores the beetles' prioritization of reproduction, even at the potential cost of reduced immune defenses.

Upon locating a suitable carcass, the beetle parents engage in a collaborative effort to bury it beneath the soil. This is a meticulous preparation process where any fur or feathers are carefully removed, and the carcass is shaped into a compact ball. This ball is then coated with a concoction of antimicrobials and secretions, a deliberate action taken by the beetles to slow down the decomposition process. It is in the vicinity of this carefully prepared carcass, now nestled within the soil, that the beetles choose to lay their eggs. A few days after the eggs are laid, the larvae hatch and instinctively navigate their way to the carcass, which serves as both their food source and nursery. The adult beetles then take on the role of providers, offering their young pre-digested food and protecting them from potential predators and competitors. This nurturing phase is critical, and should one parent abandon the effort or reduce their participation, the remaining partner compensates by ramping up their caregiving efforts through the efforts of practicing bipartialism. Instances of both parents deserting their offspring are exceptionally rare in this species, underscoring the high degree of parental investment typical of burying beetles. Moreover, the dynamic of parental decision-making in this context is fascinating, suggesting a complex interplay of negotiation and cooperation between the male and female. This is not a scenario where decisions are made unilaterally; rather, it involves continuous interaction and mutual adjustment between the parents, pointing to a sophisticated level of social coordination and communication. The decision-making process is likely a result of a negotiation involving repeated interactions between the male and female, rather than a single decision made by each parent independently.

The link between parental care and the health and growth of the offspring is profound and well-documented. Research indicates that the quality of food provisioning by the parents, particularly in terms of the carcass's freshness, plays a significant role in determining offspring health and development. For instance, one study highlighted that offspring tended to fare better in terms of growth and health when their parents were breeding on higher quality, less decomposed carcasses. This contrasted with scenarios where the parents were utilizing lower quality, more decomposed food sources, thereby underscoring the critical role of parental effort and resource quality in the developmental success of the burying beetles' young. This intricate balance between resource acquisition, parental care, and offspring development highlights the complexity of the burying beetles' reproductive and social behavior, offering valuable insights into the evolutionary pressures and adaptations that shape their life history strategies.

== Immunity ==
In the world of burying beetles, the balance between the imperatives of reproduction and the maintenance of immune function unfolds as a complex natural behavior, further showcasing the remarkable capabilities of both male and females for their practice of biparental care. This intricate dynamic involves processes where the energy and resources dedicated to reproduction must be balanced against those reserved for immune defense mechanisms.

Central to the beetle's immune arsenal is the enzyme Phenoloxidase (PO), a critical player in the cellular immune response and vital for the cuticle's hardening process. During the reproductive phase, there's a noticeable increase in PO activity, suggesting a potential impact on parental investment strategies by directly influencing reproductive success metrics. This link is pivotal because the quality and extent of parental care are directly correlated with the growth and survival rates of the offspring, making the number and mass of offspring reliable barometers of parental effort. The life cycle of burying beetles offers a vivid illustration of this equilibrium, with juvenile hormone levels experiencing a surge as larvae emerge—a phase coinciding with a noted decrease in PO levels. However, research indicates that PO levels can be upregulated in response to injury, even as larvae partake in feeding on the carcass. This aspect is particularly pertinent in scenarios involving encapsulation challenges, where a pronounced increase in PO activity would be imperative. Such an adaptive immune response to physical injury underscores the beetles' ability to navigate the potential drawbacks of immunosuppression, effectively masking any trade-offs between immune functionality and reproductive endeavors.

This nuanced dynamic underscores a sophisticated strategy employed by the beetles, allocating resources to ensure the sustenance and protection of their progeny while safeguarding their survival against the myriad environmental challenges they face. This complex interplay between reproductive strategies and immune function not only highlights the evolutionary adaptiveness of burying beetles but also offers a glimpse into the resource management strategies critical for their survival and reproductive success.

== Genes ==
In the context of burying beetles, which predominantly feed on the carrion of vertebrates, an intriguing aspect of their biology is their genetic composition, particularly in relation to their digestive capabilities. These beetles possess a very limited set of genes related to the breakdown of lignocellulose, a primary component of plant cell walls. Specifically, their genome includes just a single gene from the glycoside hydrolase family 9 (GH9) and a few from the glycoside hydrolase family 1 (GH1). This genetic makeup is somewhat unexpected, given that their diet does not typically include lignocellulosic materials, which are abundant in plant matter.

Despite the absence of a lignocellulose-rich diet, there exists a complex and highly integrated interaction between the metabolic processes of the beetles and their gut microbiome. This synergistic relationship plays a crucial role in the beetles' ability to digest their food efficiently. Moreover, the gut microbiome assists in the detoxification processes, which is vital for the beetles' ability to consume carrion, a food source that might otherwise be toxic or harmful due to decomposition and the presence of potentially pathogenic microorganisms. Furthermore, the collaboration between the beetles and their gut microbiota extends to the protection of their food source. The microbial community within the beetles' gut contributes to warding off spoilage and inhibiting the growth of competing microorganisms. This ensures that the carrion remains a viable food source for the beetles and their offspring for a longer period. This interaction highlights the importance of the gut microbiome in supplementing the beetles' digestive capabilities, allowing them to extract necessary nutrients from their specialized diet and protect their niche from competitors. This complex interplay between the beetles' metabolic functions and their gut microbiome underscores the adaptive strategies these organisms employ to thrive in their ecological niche, despite the seemingly limited genetic toolkit for digesting their primary food source.

== Future research ==
This is one of the most well-studied of the burying beetles with over 1,000 citations found via Google Scholar. N. vespilloides is also used as a model organism in the study of social immunity. In future research, this beetle will continue to be a model used to understand the many complex social behaviors that exist such as parental care, mating conflict, sibling-sibling conflict, and the genetic architecture of these behaviors.

== See also ==
Nicrophorus quadripunctuatus
