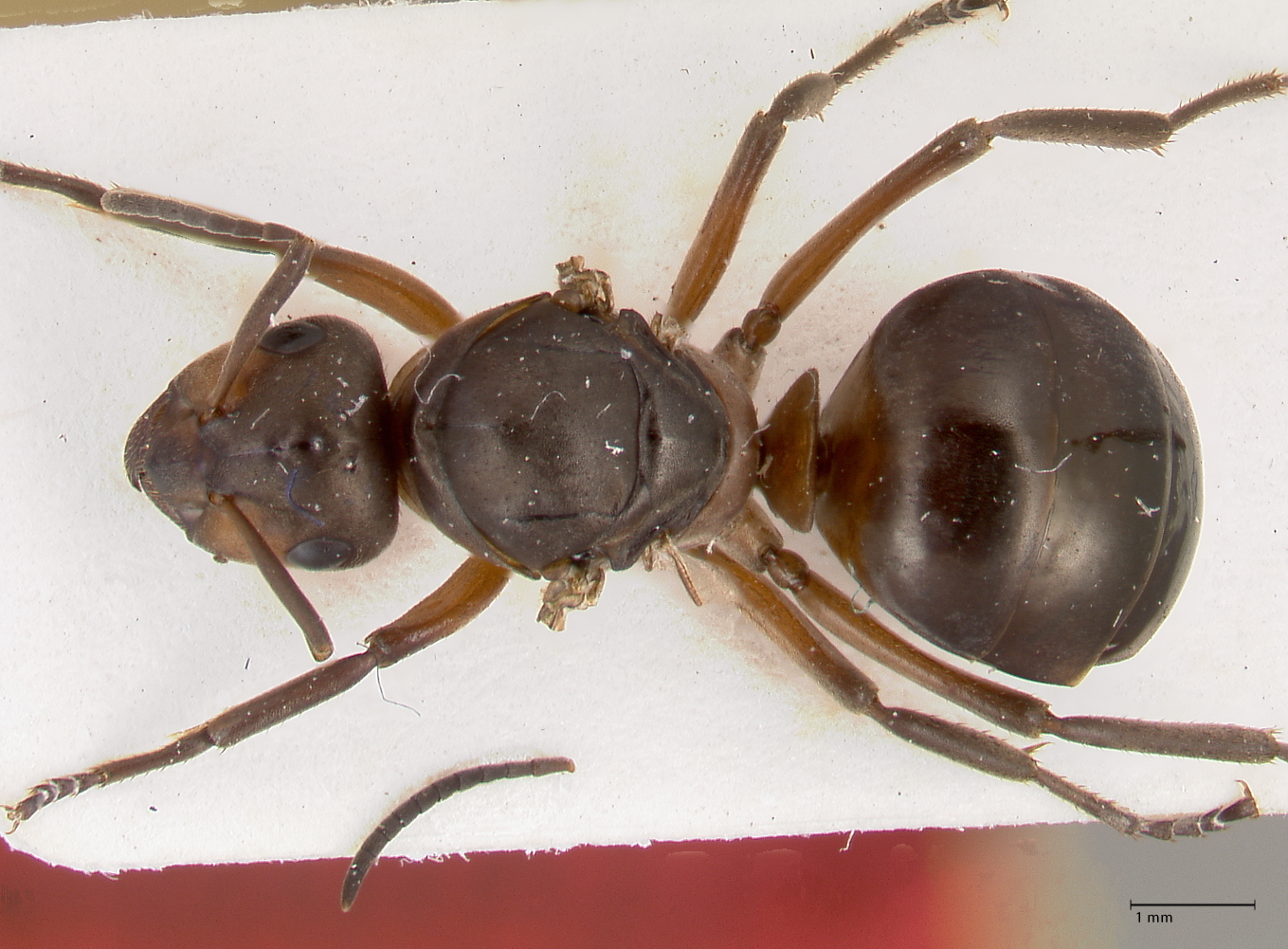
- Queen - specimen type (FoCol0762) 1

Scientific classification
- Kingdom: Animalia
- Phylum: Arthropoda
- Class: Insecta
- Order: Hymenoptera
- Family: Formicidae
- Subfamily: Formicinae
- Genus: Formica
- Species: F. paralugubris

Binomial name
- Formica paralugubris Seifert, 1996

= Formica paralugubris =

Species of ant

Formica paralugubris is a species of ant. It is a member of the Formica rufa species group native to the Alps in the Palearctic realm. It is a cryptic species, often miscategorized as Formica lugubris due to morphological similarities. The two species are capable of differentiating one another, however; F. paralugubris ants react aggressively towards F. lugubris ants.Formica paralugubris differs in its organization as a supercolony. It has been introduced into North America with the import of pine trees. It does not exhibit characteristics found in other invasive species due to its limited native range.

== Ecology ==
Nestmates within a F. paralugubris colony can recognize each other. F. paralugubris worker ants are known to collect conifer resin and place near their brood; this resin has antimicrobial properties that the ants often modify by releasing formic acid onto the resin. Formic acid in combination with conifer resin has antifungal properties.
