= Thomas McDade =

American biological anthropologist

- Born: Des Plaines, Illinois, USA

Academic background
- Education: BA, biosocial anthropology, Pomona College; PhD, anthropology, 1999, Emory University
- Thesis: Culture change, stress, and immune function in Western Samoan youth (1999)

Academic work
- Institutions: Northwestern University

Thomas Wesley McDade is an American biological anthropologist and population health scientist whose research examines how social, ecological, and developmental environments shape human biology and health. He is known for contributions to ecological immunology, population health research, and the development of minimally invasive methods for collecting biomarkers in non-clinical settings. He is an elected Fellow of the American Association for the Advancement of Science, the National Academy of Sciences, and the American Academy of Arts and Sciences.

== Early life and education ==
McDade was born in Illinois and grew up in the Pacific northwest. He graduated from Pomona College with a degree in biosocial anthropology, and completed his PhD in anthropology from Emory University followed by a postdoctoral fellowship at the Carolina Population Center.

== Career ==
McDade joined the faculty at Northwestern University (NU), in 2000. Early in his tenure at NU, McDade was the recipient of an Presidential Early Career Award for Scientists and Engineers for "undertaking important research that may ultimately improve child health through a better understanding of the social and environmental factors that affect the development of the human immune system." McDade is the director of the Laboratory for Human Biology Research, and of Cells to Society (C2S): The Center on Social Disparities and Health, as well as the director of the Graduate Cluster in Society, Biology, and Health. He is also a Faculty fellow of the Institute for Policy Research. McDade is known for interdisciplinary research integrating biological and social science approaches to the study of health and human development. He has conducted field-based research in a variety of international settings and has contributed to efforts to incorporate biological measures into population-based social science research.

In addition to his work at Northwestern, McDade is a Fellow of the Canadian Institute for Advanced Research (CIFAR) and serves as co-director of CIFAR's Child and Brain Development Program, an international research network focused on understanding the biological and social foundations of child development.

== Research ==
McDade is a biological anthropologist whose research examines how social, ecological, and developmental environments shape human biology and health across the life course. His work integrates perspectives from anthropology, immunology, epidemiology, and population health to investigate the ways in which experience becomes biologically embedded.

He is recognized for research into the developmental and ecological factors that influence immune development and inflammation. He has made important contributions to scientific understandings of inflammation, challenging the assumption that chronic inflammation is a normal or inevitable part of human aging. His research in the Philippines, Ecuador, and the US has documented how microbial and nutritional environments early in infancy, during sensitive periods of immune development, can have lasting effects on the regulation of inflammation in adulthood, with implications for aging-related diseases and functional declines.

McDade has also contributed to the development of minimally-invasive methods for assessing endocrine and immune function in field and community settings. Many of these methods utilize a small blood sample obtained through a simple finger-stick procedure, making it possible to collect biological data in large-scale population studies outside clinical settings. These methodological innovations have facilitated research on the social and ecological determinants of health in diverse populations around the world.

At the start of the COVID-19 pandemic, McDade developed the first quantitative finger-stick COVID-19 antibody test that could detect prior exposure to the SARS-CoV-2 virus, as well as level of antibody protection, in a single drop of blood. In June 2020, McDade collaborated with colleagues at Northwestern University Feinberg School of Medicine to launch "Screening for Coronavirus Antibodies in Neighborhoods (SCAN)" in Chicago, one of the earliest COVID-19 sero-prevalence studies in the US, and the first to implement fully remote, at-home blood collection. The study documented neighborhood disparities in COVID-19 exposure, and generated insight into the behavioral and contextual factors that promoted, and prevented, the spread of SARS-CoV-2 in the community.

== Honors and recognition ==
McDade received the Presidential Early Career Award for Scientists and Engineers (PECASE) in 2002, the nation's highest honor for early career scientists. In 2015, he received an endowed chair at Northwestern and was named the Carlos Montezuma Professor of Anthropology.

In 2015, he was elected a Fellow of the American Association for the Advancement of Science for his contributions to biological anthropology and population health research.

In 2021, McDade was elected to the American Academy of Arts and Sciences and to the National Academy of Sciences, among the highest distinctions accorded to scientists in the United States.
