= Mexican kingsnake =

Species named Mexican kingsnake include:

- Lampropeltis leonis
- Lampropeltis mexicana
