= Sonoran mountain kingsnake =

Sonoran mountain kingsnake is a common name for several snakes and may refer to:

- Lampropeltis knoblochi
- Lampropeltis pyromelana
