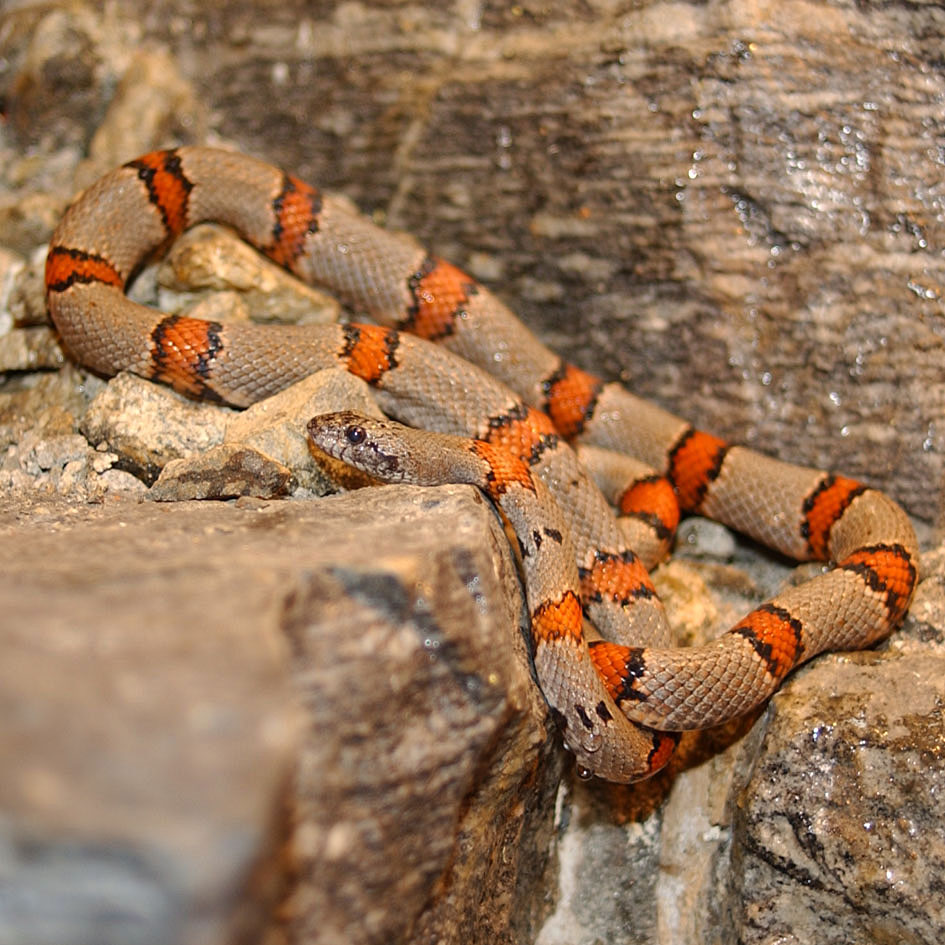

Conservation status
- Least Concern (IUCN 3.1)

Scientific classification
- Kingdom: Animalia
- Phylum: Chordata
- Class: Reptilia
- Order: Squamata
- Suborder: Serpentes
- Family: Colubridae
- Genus: Lampropeltis
- Species: L. alterna

Binomial name
- Lampropeltis alterna (A.E. Brown, 1901)

Synonyms
- Ophibolus alternus A.E. Brown, 1901; Lampropeltis alterna — Stejneger & Barbour, 1917; Lampropeltis blairi Flury, 1950; Lampropeltis mexicana blairi — Gehlbach & Baker, 1962; Lampropeltis mexicana alterna — Conant, 1975; Lampropeltis alterna blairi — Crother, 2000; Lampropeltis alterna — Wallach et al., 2014

= Gray-banded kingsnake =

Species of snake

The gray-banded kingsnake (Lampropeltis alterna), sometimes referred to as the alterna or the Davis Mountain king snake, is a species of nonvenomous snake in the family Colubridae. The species is endemic to the southwestern United States and adjacent Mexico. Some sources list two distinct subspecies of Lampropeltis alterna, as L. a. alterna and L. a. blairi differentiated by patterning and locale, but research has shown them to be color morphs of the same species.

== Taxonomy ==
Arthur Erwin Brown described the species in 1901.

The color morph "blairi", formerly specific name or subspecific name blairi, is named in honor of American zoologist William Franklin Blair.

== Description ==
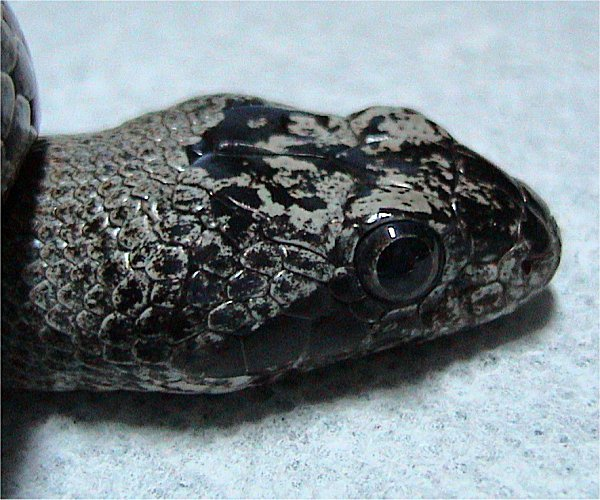
The snake's large eyes and round pupils.

A moderately sized snake, the gray-banded kingsnake can grow up to 4 ft (120 cm) in total length (including tail), with the average total length being 3 ft (91 cm). It has a relatively wide head (when compared to other kingsnake species), and has large eyes with round pupils.

L. alterna coloration and patterning vary greatly, but there are two main color morphs, which were once considered separate subspecies: the "blairi" which has wide red/orange banding, and the "alterna" which has thinner orange/red banding. Both are generally on a gray background with white and/or black accenting. There are many variations on this basic morphology found in the wild and captive bred, with some specimens even lacking orange or red banding entirely.

== Distribution and habitat ==
Lampropeltis alterna is found in the Trans-Pecos/Chihuahuan Desert region of southwestern Texas, southern New Mexico, and northern Mexico. The species is closely associated with limestone and volcanic substrates, with steep slopes and standard desert scrub.

== Behavior ==
In the wild, the gray-banded kingsnake, is not often encountered. It is a common species, but nocturnal and quite secretive. Its natural range is sparsely populated with humans, and many regions are virtually impassable due to the mountainous terrain. In the field herpetologist community, finding this snake in the wild is often considered to be a laudable feat. Most that are located are found along the roadways that transect their habitat in the Trans Pecos region. L. alterna generally has a calm disposition and is not prone to defensive reactions, like biting. They are non venomous and have an immunity to rattlesnake venom.

== Diet ==
The gray-banded kingsnake feeds primarily on lizards. It will occasionally feed on small rodents, frogs, and the eggs of ground nesting birds, lizards, and other snakes.

An "alterna" morph with lizard prey item.

== Reproduction ==
L. alterna is oviparous, laying clutches of 3–13 eggs in early summer, which hatch in approximately 9 weeks. Each hatchling is around 10 in (25 cm) in total length.

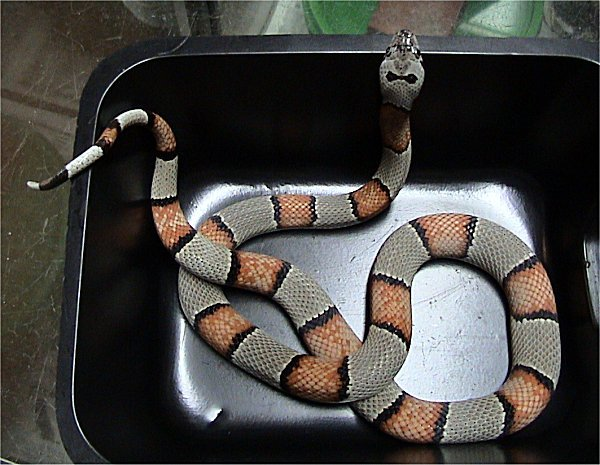
Gray-banded kingsnake, "blairi " morph.

== Conservation ==
L. alterna is regionally protected in New Mexico and Mexico. Texas does not have any regional protections, due to the number of reports in the area. Some believe that the number of reports in Texas is due to the accessibility of the region for amateur American herpetologists. In Mexico, much of the range is believed to be safe due to the low levels of human habitation, although the extreme Southern portion of the range has seen high levels of human habitation and is considered to be extremely degraded. Global warming is a mild concern, as fewer monsoons come into the area, causing more competition for water.

== Captivity ==
Gray-banded kingsnakes are commonly kept in captivity and are fairly easy to come by in the exotic pet trade. Due to their relatively small size, calm dispositions, and astounding array of pattern variations they are frequently captive bred. Many alterna breeders are strict about keeping locality bloodlines pure, and will only breed snakes from the same region, though as market demand decreases, this is becoming less and less important to some breeders. Cross breeding with other species of kingsnake, like the Nuevo León kingsnake, Lampropeltis leonis is fairly common as well.
