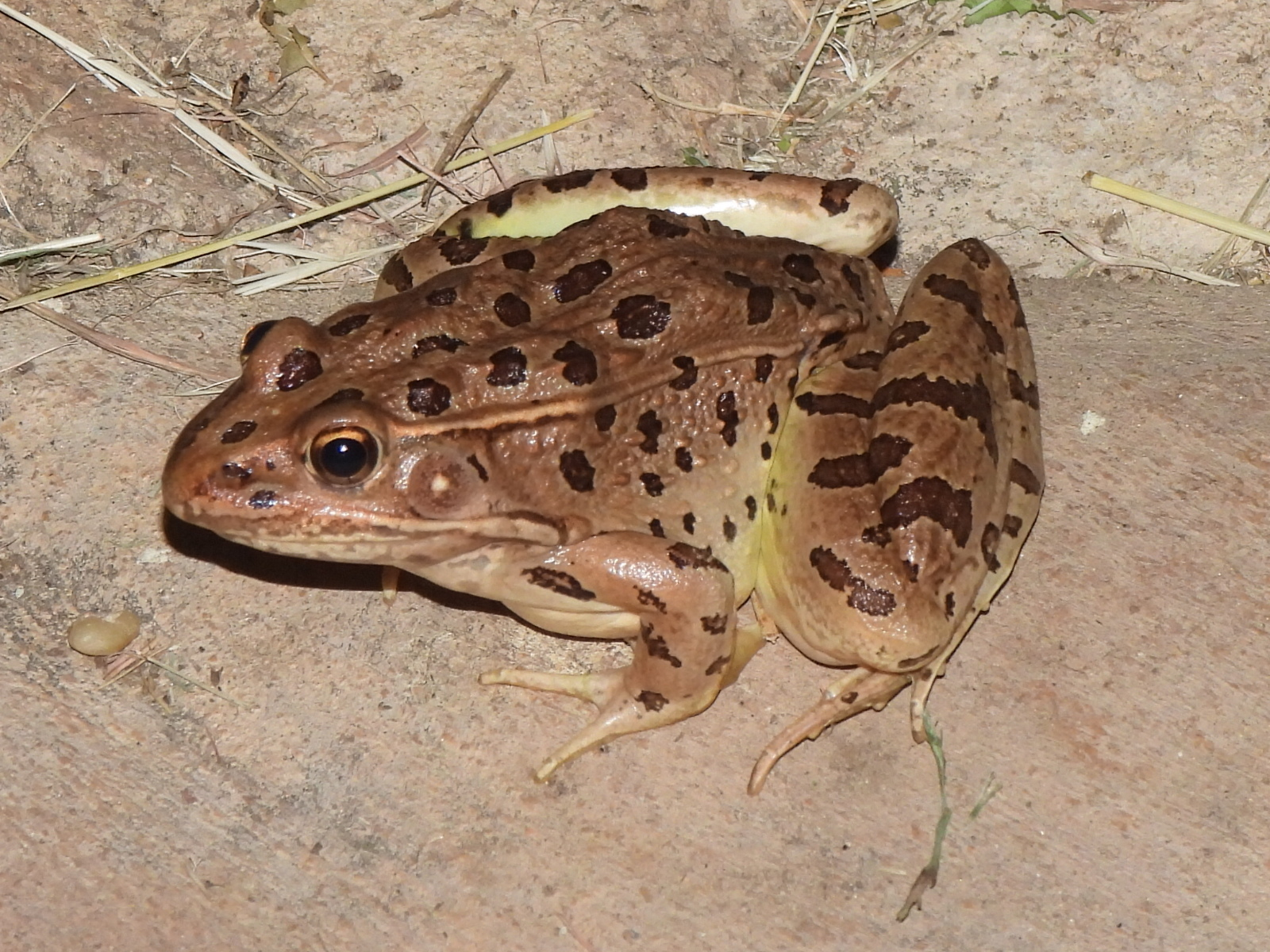

Conservation status
- Least Concern (IUCN 3.1)

- Secure (NatureServe)

Scientific classification
- Kingdom: Animalia
- Phylum: Chordata
- Class: Amphibia
- Order: Anura
- Family: Ranidae
- Genus: Lithobates
- Species: L. blairi

Binomial name
- Lithobates blairi (Mecham et al., 1973)

Synonyms
- Rana blairi Mecham, Littlejohn, Oldham, Brown & Brown, 1973

= Plains leopard frog =

Species of amphibian

The plains leopard frog (Lithobates blairi) is a spotted frog found in North America. It is sometimes referred to as Blair's leopard frog, named after the noted zoologist and University of Texas professor, Dr. W. Frank Blair.

== Description ==
The plains leopard frog grows from 2.0 to 4.3 in (5.1 to 10.9 cm) in length, and is typically brown in color. Their common name originates from the distinctive irregular, dark colored spotting on their backs. They have long, powerful legs, and are capable of leaping great distances.

The frog's spots are brown or greenish brown, and are not ringed in white. There is a distinct white line above the sides of the jaw. The lines along the sides of the back are broken toward the rear, with the short broken section closer to the center of the back. There is often a white spot in the center of the tympanum, and a dark spot on the top the snout.

== Behavior ==
Although found throughout semiarid regions, the plains leopard frog is almost always found in or very near permanent water sources, such as streams, creeks, and ponds. They are nocturnal, and primarily insectivorous, though they will eat almost anything they can overpower and swallow, including other frogs. They are shy animals, often fleeing beneath the water if approached.

== Geographic distribution ==
The plains leopard frog, as its name implies, is found throughout the Great Plains of the United States, from Indiana west across central and southern plains to South Dakota, south to Colorado, New Mexico, and Texas, with a disjunct population in Arizona.

== Conservation status ==
The plains leopard frog is fairly common throughout its range, and holds no special conservation status, except in the state of Indiana, where it is endangered. This is probably because of the use of fertilizers and pesticides in farms located near this frog's habitats.
