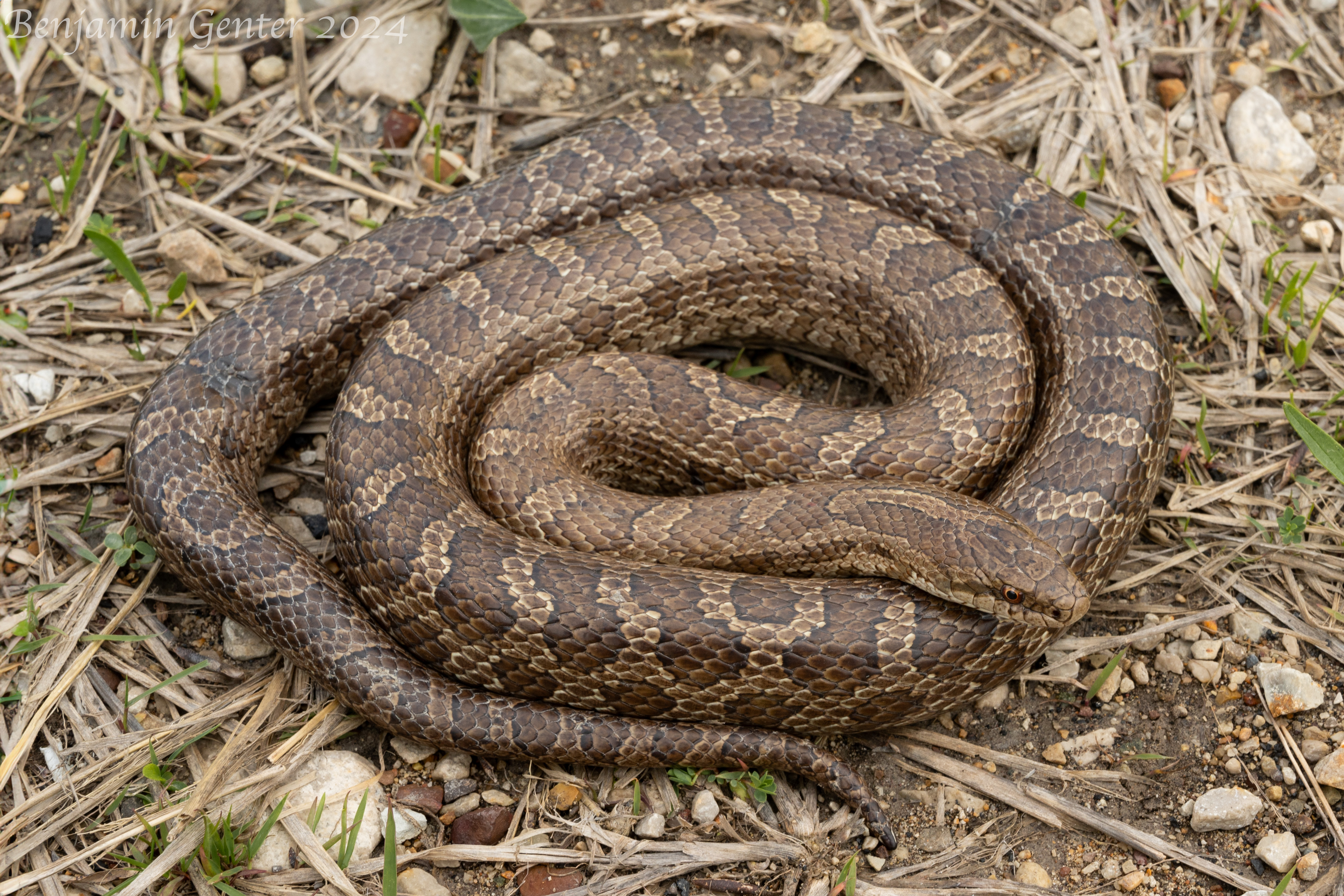

Conservation status
- Least Concern (IUCN 3.1)

Scientific classification
- Kingdom: Animalia
- Phylum: Chordata
- Class: Reptilia
- Order: Squamata
- Suborder: Serpentes
- Family: Colubridae
- Genus: Lampropeltis
- Species: L. calligaster

Binomial name
- Lampropeltis calligaster (Harlan, 1827)
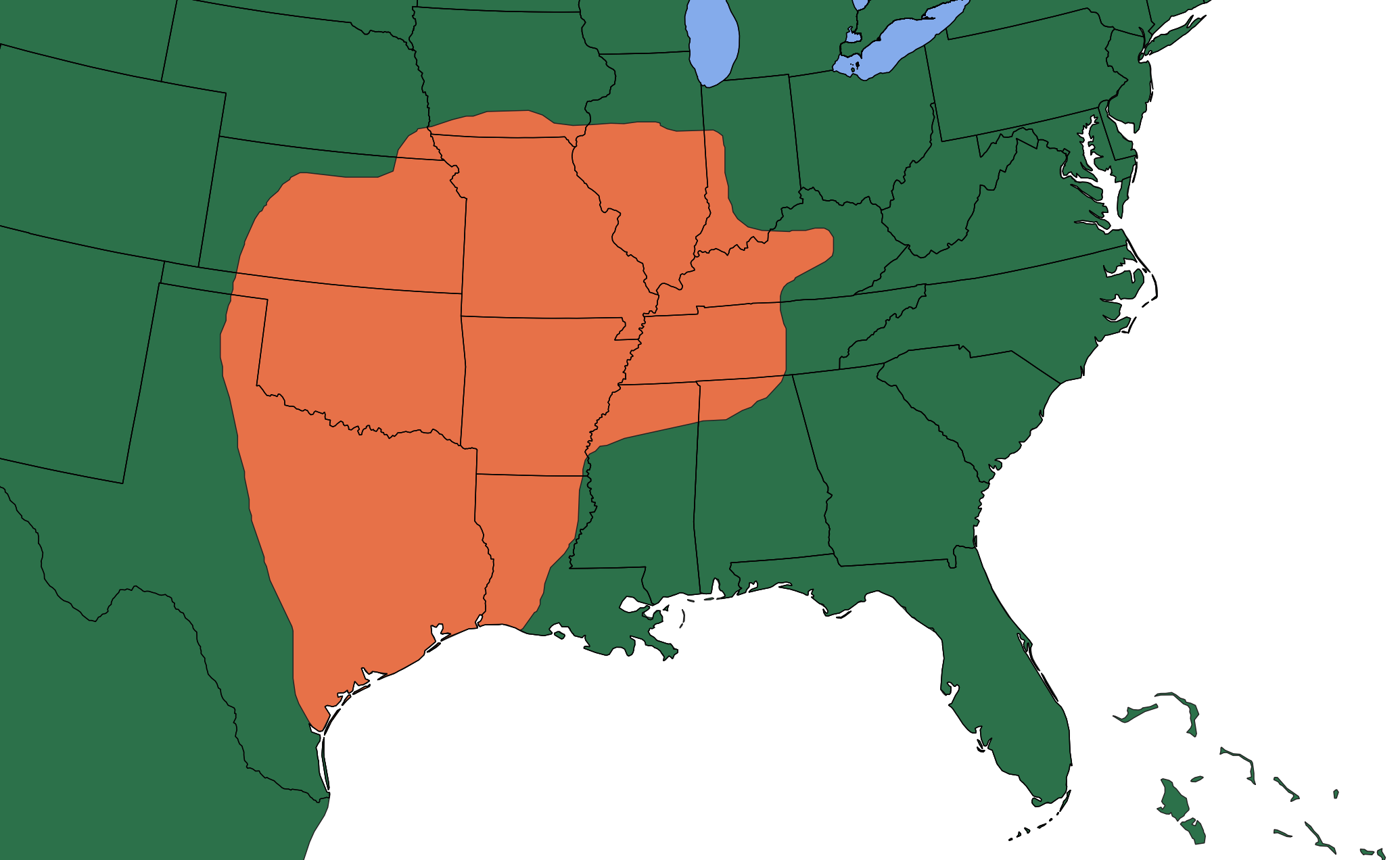

Synonyms
- Coluber calligaster Harlan, 1827; Ablabes triangulum var. calligaster Hallowell, 1856; Ophibolus calligaster Cope, 1900

= Lampropeltis calligaster =

Species of snake

Lampropeltis calligaster is a species of kingsnake known commonly as the prairie kingsnake or yellow-bellied kingsnake.

== Geographic range ==
Prairie kingsnakes are found across 13 states in the midwestern and southern United States.

== Description ==
Prairie kingsnakes are light brown or grey-brown in color, with dark reddish-brown blotching down the dorsal length of their bodies. Their ventral side is pale or yellowish. They are capable of growing to lengths of 76–110 cm (30–43 in), with males longer and heavier on average than females. They are easily mistaken for some species of colubrid snakes of the genus Pantherophis, which can have similar markings. Dorsal marking may fade with age. The mole kingsnake (Lampropeltis rhombomaculata) and the South Florida mole kingsnake (Lampropeltis occipitolineata) were previously considered subspecies, but DNA analysis found them to be distinct species.

== Etymology ==
The generic name, Lampropeltis, is derived from Greek Lampros, meaning "shiny", and pelta, meaning "shield", likely in reference to the genus' smooth and shiny dorsal scales. The specific name, calligaster, is derived from Greek Kallos, for "beauty", and gaster, for "belly".

== Diet ==
Fitch (1978) found that prairie voles were most commonly consumed, but prairie kingsnakes also ate other small mammals, reptiles, and northern bobwhite eggs. Prairie kingsnakes are nonvenomous constrictors, so they coil around their prey and suffocate it until dead.

== Behavior ==
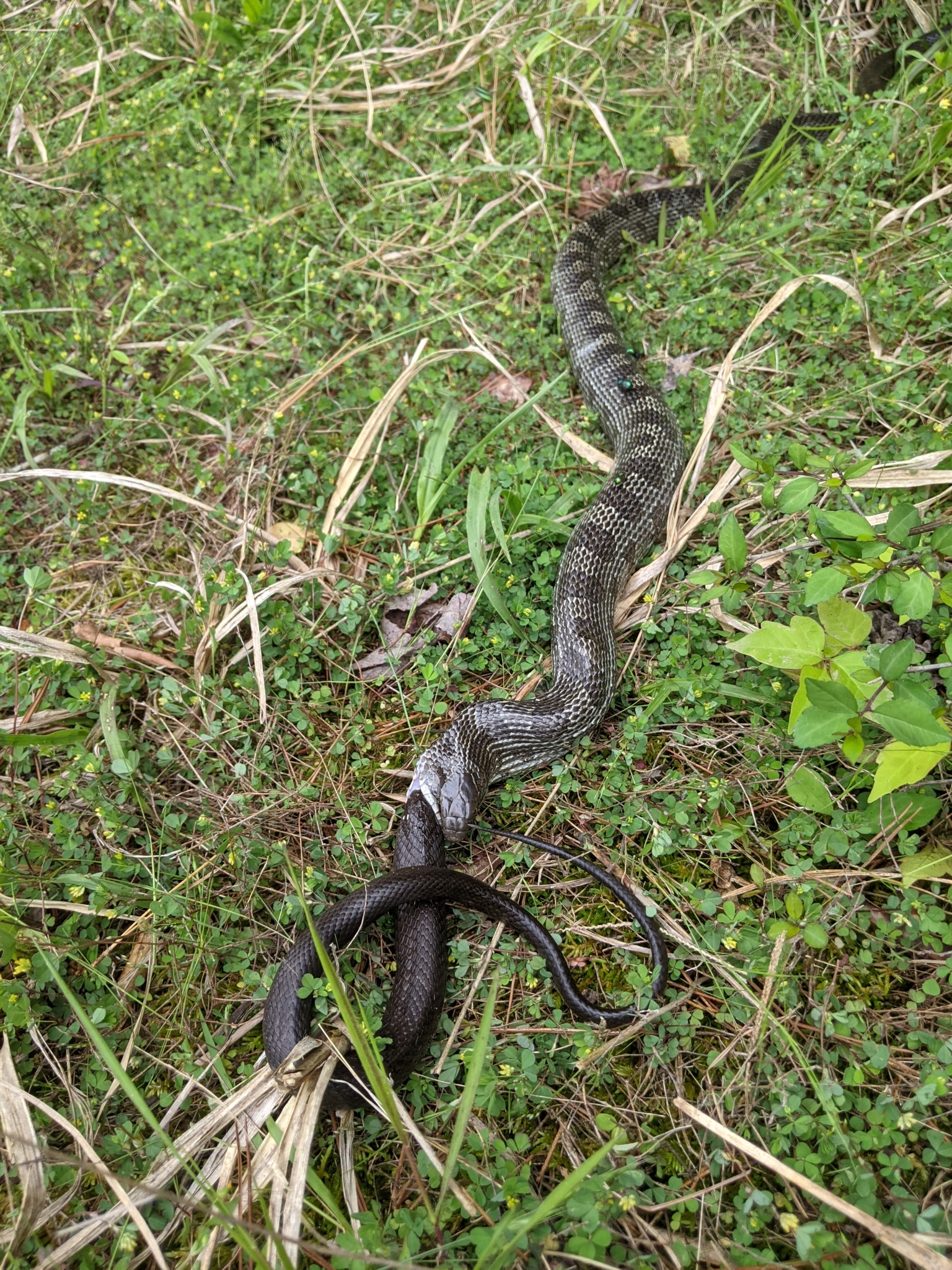
Eating a western ratsnake

They are typically docile. Like most colubrids, if harassed they will shake their tail, which, if in dry leaf litter, can sound like a rattlesnake. They are not typically prone to biting and may excrete a foul-smelling musk if handled. In central Illinois, they emerge from hibernation in late March and enter hibernation mid-October. Females maintain an average body temperature nearly two degrees Celsius higher than males, which may help females grow faster, reach earlier reproductive maturity, or develop larger clutch sizes. When aboveground, prairie kingsnakes can maintain an average body temperature that is similar regardless of whether they are exposed or under cover, indicating that they can thermoregulate under cover while being concealed from predators.

Richardson et al. (2006) radio-tracked prairie kingsnakes in Illinois and found that they were usually underground during the day, so they are probably mostly nocturnal. Richardson et al. (2006) also found that home ranges of male prairie kingsnakes averaged over four times larger than those of females, home ranges often included the individual's hibernation site, and home ranges were the same from one year to the next. Males and females move with the same frequency and travel equivalent distances per move. Prairie kingsnakes may use road embankments, rock ledges, and mammal burrows in grasslands that are indistinguishable from those used throughout their active period to individually hibernate.

== Habitat ==
Prairie kingsnakes primarily use prairie, pasture, and shrublands, less often use forests, and appear to never use croplands or cross roads, which may fragment their habitat and be barriers to movement. They will also use edges between grasslands and roads or forests, especially females that may use warmer road edges to help with egg production.

== Reproduction ==
Many adult females do not breed within a given year. Egg laying has been reported in June through July, with clutch sizes averaging 10 eggs that hatch in late August or September. Prairie kingsnakes often double in length during their first year of life and reach sexual maturity after two to three years.
