= California mountain snake =

California mountain snake may refer to:

- A shortened name for the California mountain kingsnake.
- California mountain snake is also the codename of Daryl Hannah's character Elle Driver in the Kill Bill movies, directed by Quentin Tarantino.
