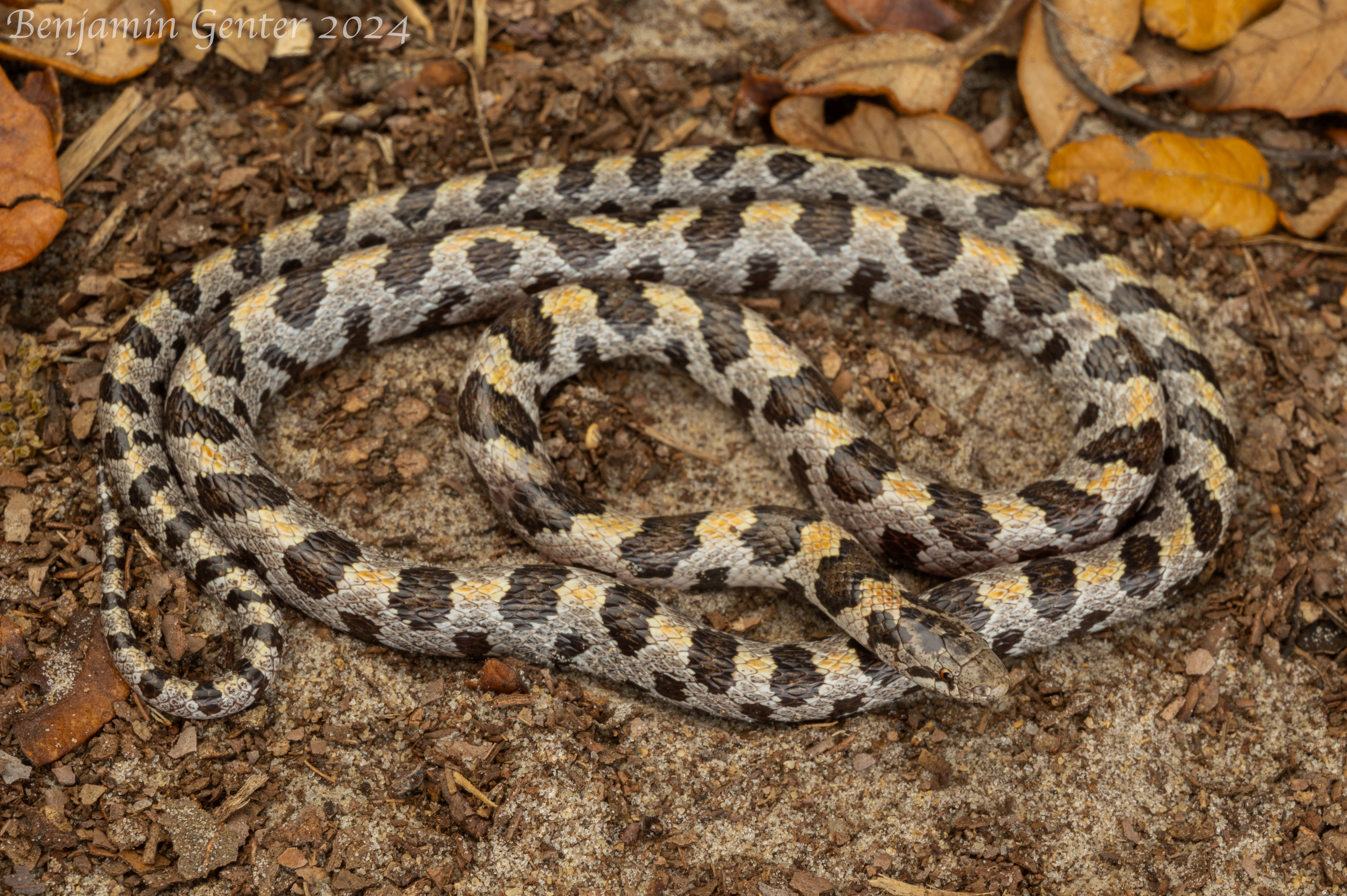

Conservation status
- Near Threatened (IUCN 3.1)

Scientific classification
- Kingdom: Animalia
- Phylum: Chordata
- Class: Reptilia
- Order: Squamata
- Suborder: Serpentes
- Family: Colubridae
- Genus: Lampropeltis
- Species: L. extenuata

Binomial name
- Lampropeltis extenuata (Brown, 1890)

Synonyms
- Stilosoma extenuata Brown, 1890; Stilosoma extenuatum — Cope, 1892; Stylophis extenuatus — Berg, 1901; Stylophis extenuatus — Stejneger & Barbour, 1917; Stilosoma extenuatum — Stejneger & Barbour, 1933; Lampropeltis extenuata — Pyron & Burbrink, 2009

= Short-tailed snake =

Species of snake

The short-tailed snake (Lampropeltis extenuata) is a species of small harmless snake in the family Colubridae. Fossorial and seldom seen, the short-tailed snake is found only in sandy, upland parts of Florida where it is listed as "Threatened" and is protected by state law.

== Etymology ==
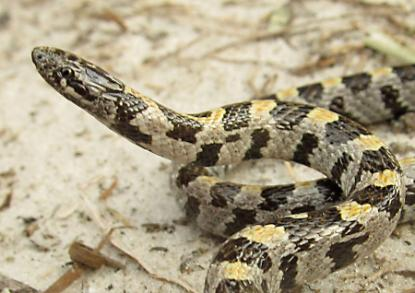
Hernando County, FL 2011

The short-tailed snake's tail comprises less than ten percent of the snake's total length, hence the common name. Originally described and named by A. Erwin Brown in 1890 as Stilosoma extenuatum, its generic name was derived from the Greek stylos for "pillar" and soma for "body". This refers to the stiffness of the short-tailed snake's body, which is caused by its wide and inflexible column of unusually short vertebrae. The specific name, extenuata, is Latin for "thin" or "slender".

== Description ==
The short-tailed snake is a small serpent averaging 36–51 cm (14–20 in) in total length (tail included), with a record total length measurement of 65.4 cm (25 3/4 in), and is perhaps as thin as a pencil. It is gray above with 50 to 80 dark blotches and may or may not have a yellow stripe running down the spine. The underside is white with dark brown blotches. It bears a more-than-superficial resemblance to other kingsnakes, especially the mole kingsnake (Lampropeltis calligaster rhombomaculata), but can be distinguished by its smaller size and much more slender build. Also, Lampropeltis extenuatua has six upper labials, whereas other kingsnakes of the genus Lampropeltis have seven upper labials.

== Behavior ==
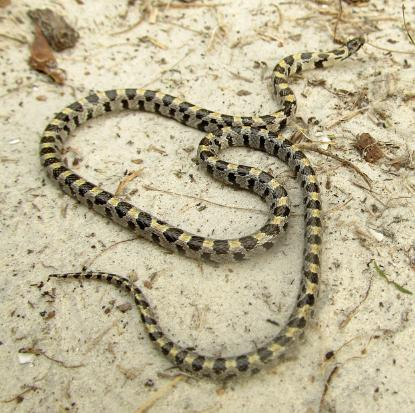
Hernando County, FL 2011

The short-tailed snake is as poorly understood as it is seldom-seen, rare and geographically limited. It is a burrowing snake that rarely appears above ground and does so even more rarely during the day. Like other snakes of the tribe Lampropeltini, it vibrates its tail when startled by predators or people but can be distinguished from a rattlesnake by its slender build and lack of a rattle. An excitable snake, it makes a poor captive and is protected against harassment or captivity by Florida law. Despite this, much of what little we know about the short-tailed snake has been based on observations of captive specimens.

== Diet ==
Captive specimens of Lampropeltis extenuata show a keen preference for black-crowned snakes of the genus Tantilla and will often eat them exclusively, rejecting other species of small snake or lizard. It is possible that black-crowned snakes, some of which are themselves small, burrowing snakes endemic to Florida, comprise the entire diet of wild short-tailed snakes. In the wild this species has been known to eat all of the aforementioned species as well as the Florida worm lizard (Rhineura floridana), a fossorial amphisbaenian that is endemic to Florida.

== Geographic range ==
The short-tailed snake is found only in a handful of counties in central Florida.

== Habitat ==
The preferred natural habitat of the short-tailed snake is sandy-soiled pine or oak forest or shrubland, but it may be found in other habitats, provided it has access to prey and suitable soil for burrowing.

== Reproduction ==
Lampropeltis extenuata is oviparous.

== Evolution and taxonomy ==
As a member of the tribe Lampropeltini, Lampropeltis extenuata is ultimately derived from Old World rat snakes that crossed the Bering Land Bridge into North America more than 20 million years ago. More recently, L. extenuata is a relict of the Miocene "Florida Island", separated from the mainland by higher sea levels. It is closely related to the kingsnakes and still bears a resemblance to the mole kingsnake which is also found in Florida. One fossil species, Stilosoma vetustum, dates from the late Miocene, some 5–10 million years ago. How far divergent L. extenuata is from its kingsnake ancestors is still a matter of debate. In 2009 Pyron and Burbrink resolved to include it in the kingsnake genus Lampropeltis based on multiple lines of molecular and morphological evidence obtained in theirs and earlier studies.
