= Black moccasin =

Black moccasin may refer to:

- Agkistrodon piscivorus, the cottonmouth, a venomous pitviper species found in the eastern United States
- Lampropeltis getula, the eastern kingsnake, a harmless colubrid species found in the eastern United States
