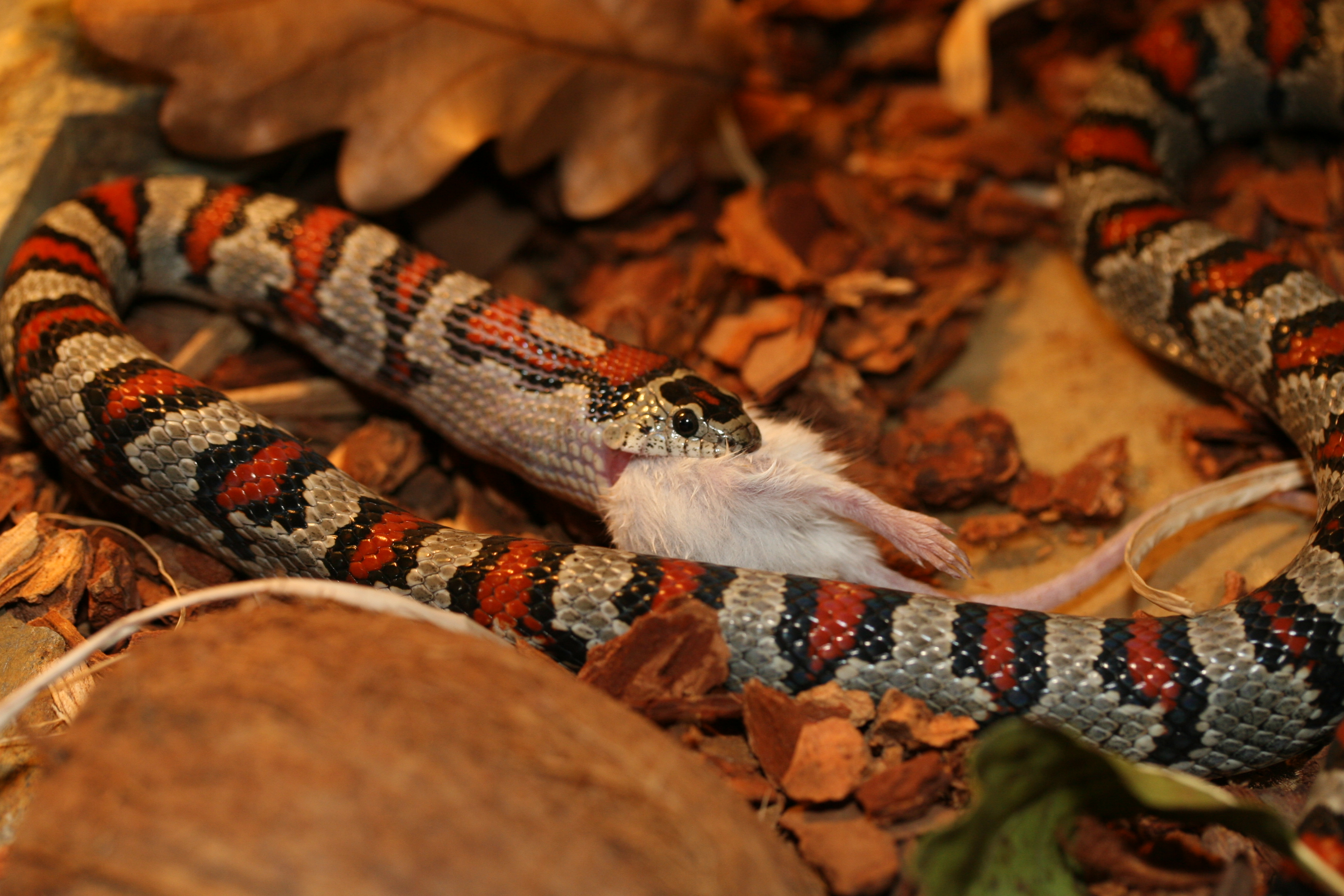

Scientific classification
- Kingdom: Animalia
- Phylum: Chordata
- Class: Reptilia
- Order: Squamata
- Suborder: Serpentes
- Family: Colubridae
- Genus: Lampropeltis
- Species: L. greeri

Binomial name
- Lampropeltis greeri Webb, 1961

= Lampropeltis greeri =

Species of snake

Lampropeltis greeri, commonly known as Greer's kingsnake, is a species of nonvenomous snake in the family Colubridae. It is found in Mexico.
