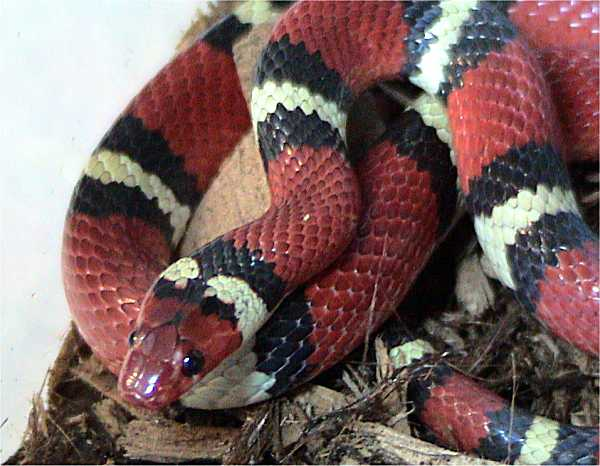
- Scarlet kingsnake (Lampropeltis elapsoides)

Scientific classification
- Kingdom: Animalia
- Phylum: Chordata
- Class: Reptilia
- Order: Squamata
- Suborder: Serpentes
- Family: Colubridae
- Tribe: Lampropeltini
- Genus: Lampropeltis; Fitzinger, 1843

Synonyms
- Ablabes, Bellophis, Herpetodryas, Ophibolus, Osceola, Phibolus, Pseudelaps, Zacholus

= Kingsnake =

Kingsnakes Temporal range: Miocene – recent

Genus of snakes

Kingsnakes are colubrid New World members of the genus Lampropeltis, which includes 26 species. Among these, about 45 subspecies are recognized. They are nonvenomous and ophiophagous in diet.

== Description ==
Kingsnakes vary widely in size and coloration. They can be as small as 24" (61 cm) or as long as 60" (152 cm). Some kingsnakes are colored in muted browns to black, while others are brightly marked in white, reds, yellows, grays, and lavenders that form rings, longitudinal stripes, speckles, and saddle-shaped bands.

Most kingsnakes have quite vibrant patterns. Some species, such as the scarlet kingsnake, Mexican milk snake, and red milk snake, have coloration and patterning that can cause them to be confused with the highly venomous coral snakes. One of the mnemonic rhymes to help people distinguish between coral snakes and their nonvenomous lookalikes in the United States is "red on black, a friend of Jack; red on yellow, kill a fellow". Other variations include "red on yellow kill a fellow, red on black venom lack", and referencing the order of traffic lights "yellow, red, stop!" All these mnemonics apply only to the three species of coral snakes native to the southern United States: Micrurus fulvius (the eastern or common coral snake), Micrurus tener (the Texas coral snake), and Micruroides euryxanthus (the Arizona coral snake). Coral snakes found in other parts of the world can have distinctly different patterns, red bands touching black bands, having only pink and blue bands, or having no bands at all.

== Etymology ==
Lampropeltis includes the Greek words for "shiny shield": λαμπρός lampro(s) ("shiny") + πέλτη pelt(ē) ("peltē shield") + -is (a Latin suffix). The name is given to them in reference to their smooth, enamel-like dorsal scales.

The "king" in the common name (as with the king cobra) refers to its preying on other snakes.

== Range ==
Kingsnakes are native to North America, where they are found in much of the United States and into Mexico. The genus has adapted to a wide variety of habitats, including tropical forests, shrublands, and deserts. Kingsnakes are found coast-to-coast across North America, with some as far north as Montana, North Dakota, New Jersey, Illinois and Ohio; south of those areas, there are kingsnakes to be found in nearly every corner of the lower-48 United States. Kingsnakes are also found virtually coast-to-coast across México, all the way down to the México-Guatemala border. Further south from there, milksnakes become the more predominant kingsnake in Central America, such as the Honduran milk snake.

== Reproduction ==
In spring, males go looking for females and sometimes fight with rival males. During the summer, females deposit between 3 and 29 eggs in damp, decaying logs, stumps, or piles of sawdust. The eggs take about 50 to 65 days to hatch, with the exact timing depending on incubation temperature.

== Behavior and diet ==
Kingsnakes are primarily terrestrial, but they are also known to be capable climbers and swimmers.

Kingsnakes use constriction to kill their prey and tend to be opportunistic feeders. They are known to seek out and eat other snakes (ophiophagy), including venomous snakes such as rattlesnakes, cottonmouths, and copperheads. Some known non-venomous prey species of the kingsnake include gopher snakes, corn snakes, hognoses, and bullsnakes, garter snakes, rosy boa, water snakes, and brown snakes. Kingsnakes also eat a variety of lizards, rodents, birds, and eggs. The common kingsnake is known to be immune to the venom of other snakes and does eat rattlesnakes, but it is not necessarily immune to the venom of snakes from distant localities.

Kingsnakes such as the California kingsnake can exert twice as much constriction force relative to its body size as rat snakes and pythons. Scientists believe that such strong coils may be an adaptation to eating snakes and other reptilian prey, which can endure lower blood-oxygen levels before asphyxiating.

== Ecology ==
Kingsnakes help control the populations of venomous snakes through their diet, which can pose a threat to humans.

== Predators ==
Kingsnakes are often preyed upon by large vertebrates such as birds of prey. Tarantulas also sometimes prey on them. In addition, other kingsnakes themselves constitute a considerable threat, as all species of kingsnakes are known snake- and reptile-eaters.

== List of kingsnake species and subspecies ==
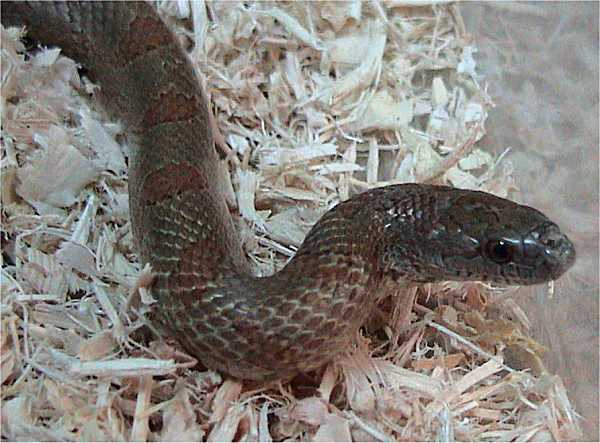
Mole kingsnake (Lampropeltis rhombomaculata)

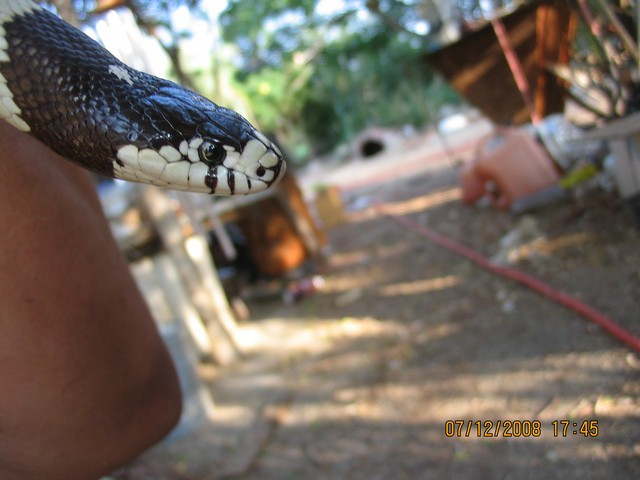
California kingsnake (Lampropeltis californiae)

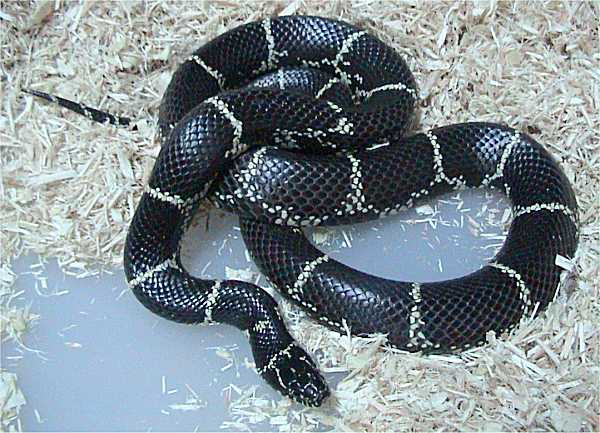
Eastern kingsnake (Lampropeltis getula getula)

Speckled kingsnake (Lampropeltis holbrooki)

Kingsnake species and subspecies include (listed here alphabetically by specific and subspecific name):

- Guatemalan milk snake, Lampropeltis abnorma (Bocourt, 1886)
- Gray-banded kingsnake, Lampropeltis alterna (A. E. Brown, 1901)
- Mexican milk snake, Lampropeltis annulata Kennicott, 1860
- California kingsnake, Lampropeltis californiae (Blainville, 1835)
  - Mexican black kingsnake, L. c. nigrita Zweifel & Norris, 1955
- Prairie kingsnake, Lampropeltis calligaster (Harlan, 1827)
- Santa Catalina Island kingsnake, Lampropeltis catalinensis Van Denburgh & Slevin, 1921
- Scarlet kingsnake or scarlet milk snake, Lampropeltis elapsoides (Holbrook, 1838)
- Short-tailed snake, Lampropeltis extenuata (R.E. Brown, 1890)
- Central Plains milk snake, Lampropeltis gentilis (Baird & Girard, 1853)
- Common kingsnake, Lampropeltis getula (Linnaeus, 1766)
  - Brooks's kingsnake, L. g. brooksi Barbour, 1919
  - Florida kingsnake, L. g. floridana (Blanchard, 1919)
  - Eastern kingsnake, L. g. getula (Linnaeus, 1766)
  - Apalachicola Lowlands kingsnake, L. g. meansi Krysko & Judd, 2006
- Greer's kingsnake, Lampropeltis greeri (Webb, 1961)
- Speckled kingsnake, Lampropeltis holbrooki Stejneger, 1902
- Madrean mountain kingsnake, Lampropeltis knoblochi Taylor, 1940
- Nuevo León kingsnake, Lampropeltis leonis (Günther, 1893)
- Mexican kingsnake, Lampropeltis mexicana (Garman, 1884)
- Ecuadorian milk snake, Lampropeltis micropholis Cope, 1860
- Black kingsnake, Lampropeltis nigra (Yarrow, 1882)
- South Florida mole kingsnake, Lampropeltis occipitolineata Price, 1987
- Atlantic Central American milk snake, Lampropeltis polyzona Cope, 1860
- Arizona mountain kingsnake, Lampropeltis pyromelana (Cope, 1866)
  - Utah mountain kingsnake, L. p. infralabialis W. Tanner, 1953
  - Arizona mountain kingsnake, L. p. pyromelana (Cope, 1866)
- Mole kingsnake, Lampropeltis rhombomaculata (Holbrook, 1840)
- Ruthven's kingsnake, Lampropeltis ruthveni (Blanchard, 1920)
- Desert kingsnake, Lampropeltis splendida (Baird & Girard, 1853)
- Milk snake, Lampropeltis triangulum (Lacépède, 1789)
- Lampropeltis webbi Bryson, Dixon & Lazcano, 2005
- California mountain kingsnake, Lampropeltis zonata (Lockington, 1876 ex Blainville, 1835)
  - San Pedro kingsnake, L. z. agalma (Van Denburgh & Slevin, 1923)
  - Todos Santos Island kingsnake, L. z. herrerae (Van Denburgh & Slevin, 1923)
  - Sierra Nevada mountain kingsnake, L. z. multicincta (Yarrow, 1882)
  - Coast Ranges mountain kingsnake, L. z. multifasciata (Bocourt, 1886)
  - San Bernardino mountain kingsnake, L. z. parvirubra Zweifel, 1952
  - San Diego mountain kingsnake, L. z. pulchra Zweifel, 1952
  - Saint Helena mountain kingsnake, L. z. zonata (Lockington, 1876 ex Blainville, 1835)

Additionally, Pyron and Burbrink have argued that the short-tailed snake (Stilosoma extenuatum) (Brown, 1890) should be included in Lampropeltis.
