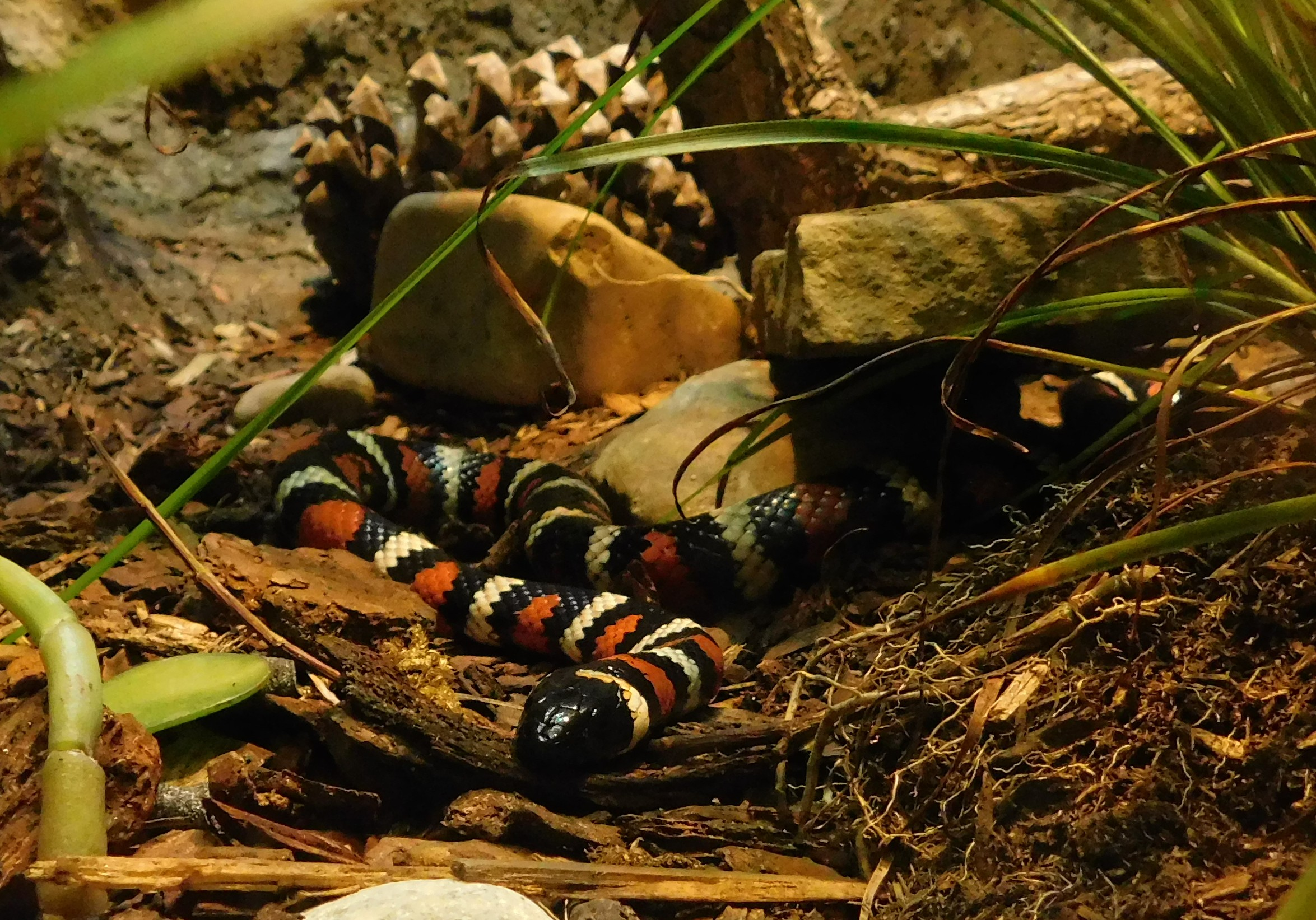

Scientific classification
- Kingdom: Animalia
- Phylum: Chordata
- Class: Reptilia
- Order: Squamata
- Suborder: Serpentes
- Family: Colubridae
- Genus: Lampropeltis
- Species: L. zonata
- Subspecies: L. z. pulchra

Trinomial name
- Lampropeltis zonata pulchra Zweifel, 1952

= San Diego mountain kingsnake =

Subspecies of snake

The San Diego mountain kingsnake (Lampropeltis zonata pulchra) is a subspecies of nonvenomous colubrid snake endemic to Southern California. Its state-level conservation status is "Species of Special Concern".

== Description ==
A medium-sized (53–108 cm total length) snake with a distinctive sequence of red, black, and white rings (tricolor dyads:; these are similar, but yet different from the triads of) in which relatively narrow white rings are always bordered by black rings, and red coloration, which can occur as rings or bands, borders alternate black rings. Occasional aberrant patterns can be found in which rings are lacking (see Figure 2 in). The number of tricolor dyads on the body (except the tail) ranges from 27 to 38, and between 15% and 100% of the red rings between body dyads are complete. The snout is jet black and the iris is very dark brown.

== Taxonomic remarks ==
The taxonomic remarks made for Lampropeltis zonata parvirubra also apply to this taxon, namely:

"This taxon has not been reexamined since Zweifel described the races of Lampropeltis zonata. Diagnosis of L. zonata parvirubra is problematic because allocation of individuals to this taxon requires using a combination of several characters simultaneously that individually overlap considerably in variation with other races of L. zonata. Biochemical analyses coupled to more extensive morphological analyses are needed to better understand the systematic status of this taxon. Since individuals of L. z. parvirubra are difficult to obtain (captive snakes notwithstanding), novel techniques such as DNA extraction from preserved specimens will almost certainly be needed to help resolve this problem. DNA analysis was performed on this taxon in 1999, and the interpretation of the authors suggests that L. z. pulchra and L. z. parvirubra belong within the same subspecies, and merely represent a clinal variation in pattern from south to north within the range. Interpretation of this taxon as a full species (Collins 1991) is unjustified and awaits the aforementioned analyses."

A new multi-locus nuclear phylogenetic assessment in 2013 found multiple species-level taxa between former L. zonata subspecies, suggesting that L. z. pulchra and all other Lampropeltis zonata subspecies south of Monterey Bay be lumped into a separate species, the coast mountain kingsnake (Lampropeltis multifasciata). As of June 2016, the Society for the Study of Amphibians and Reptiles shows the common names to be California Mountain Kingsnake and Coast Mountain Kingsnake.

== Distribution ==
This California endemic occurs in the Santa Monica Mountains (Los Angeles County), Santa Ana Mountains (Orange and Riverside Counties), Santa Rosa Mountains (Riverside County), and Corte Madera, Cuyamaca, Hot Springs, Laguna, and Palomar Mountains (San Diego County). In reality, this snake is probably present on all mountains in San Diego County above 4,000 feet (1,200 m) elevation, or which support proper habitat. Its elevation range extends from near sea level to ca. 1800 m (Palomar Mountain). Two early specimens (SDSNH 9930, USNM 13889) and three post-1960 records (B. McGurty, pers. comm.) from western San Diego County suggest the possibility of native populations of this taxon near the coast. However, the latter records have remained unverified and the former may represent mislabeled specimens or escaped or released pets (B. McGurty, pers. comm.).

== Life history ==
Lampropeltis zonata pulchra is an infrequently observed, secretive, cryptobiotic snake, the life history of which is still only partly understood. The San Diego mountain kingsnake typically emerges from overwintering sites in March and may remain near-surface active through November, but it is particularly conspicuous near the surface from roughly mid-March to mid-May (Klauber 1931,), during which time it is active during the warmer daylight hours. Later in the season, it may be active after dark, which is probably related to the fact that, like most snakes, it has a relatively low temperature preferendum and a relatively low critical thermal maximum (42.5 °C: data provided for L. zonata, subspecies not specified;). Based on wild-caught captive individuals, mating probably takes place in May and eggs are usually laid in June or early July. Females lay 4–9 moderate-sized (averages 36 mm long × 16 mm wide), bone-white, leathery-shelled eggs that if similar to eggs incubated in captivity, require at least 2 months to develop before hatching. Hatchlings are usually first observed between late August and early October. The time required to reach reproductive maturity in the field is unknown, but captive L. z. pulchra required 4–5 years to reach sexual maturity. If captive longevity records for other races of this species are any indication, then San Diego mountain kingsnakes may be relatively long-lived. Indications exist that L. z. pulchra may be highly philopatric, consistently using local patches of suitable habitat, but the movement patterns of this taxon are largely unknown. In most areas, this snake is much more extant than previously believed, and not restricted to rock outcrops. It lives underground, and has been found in rockless areas using stumps, logs, and artificial cover, such as old boards, tins, concrete, asphalt chunks, and even trash. The only ingredients needed to sustain a population of L. z. pulchra are prey and shelter. This taxon is also probably primarily saurophagous, and only western fence lizards and western skinks have been recorded as having been eaten by San Diego mountain kingsnakes, but prey similar to other subspecies of L. zonata are probably also taken (Newton and Smith 1975).

== Habitat ==
In the interior mountain ranges, Lampropeltis zonata pulchra occurs primarily in associations of ponderosa pine, Jeffrey pine, Coulter pine, and black oak, and is infrequently found below the coniferous forest associations; however, the snakes will also follow riparian corridors to lower elevations, such as Oak Grove campground in San Diego County. At lower elevations and in coastal ranges, it occurs below the edge of mixed oak-coniferous forest in riparian woodlands, usually in canyon bottoms, that have western sycamore (Platanus racemosa), Fremont's cottonwood, coast live oak, willows, wild rose (Rosa spp.), and blackberries. It may be found in narrow riparian woodlands in association with chaparral and coastal sage vegetation types. Rocks or rocky outcrops appear to be only one element of L. z. pulchra habitat, probably because they provide suitable refuge sites and they harbor the necessary food resources. Such locations may also provide overwintering sites; however, L. z. pulchra can also be found on chaparral-covered hillsides in the Santa Monica Mountains, Santa Ana Mountains, and all other mountainous habitat they occupy, far from any rock. The snakes live underground in all areas, and those lacking rocky cover simply utilize rodent burrows for refuge.

== Status ==
California state status: "Special Concern"

This snake continues to be highly prized among collectors despite prohibitions on collecting or selling it in California (Nicola 1981, California Fish and Game Commission 1990). The only individuals that can be possessed are those that were in possession of their owners prior to when the prohibition on collection regulations were implemented. Currently, this taxon is mentioned for sale in some reptile fancier lists at $250.00 per snake; such a demand undoubtedly fuels a black market trade for this taxon among collectors. In addition, provided data for a single locality in San Diego County, suggesting a local decline in L. z. pulchra that he attributes to overcollecting of this taxon. Since no obvious habitat change has occurred at this site, the interpretation provided may be correct. also cites the destruction of local habitat by overzealous collectors (the dismantling of outcrops and the shredding of logs and stumps), especially in San Diego County, as reasons for this taxon's decline (see also Newton and Smith 1975). Rock-chipping for this taxon as well as for selected lizards was a problem that was recognized over 15 years ago, and continues to be a problem in certain local areas despite the fact that altering habitat in this way is prohibited under current regulations by both State and Federal land-management and resource agencies. Illegal fuelwood harvesting also adds to the problem of habitat alteration. While pointed out a problem with caprock removal and other forms of "rock-chipping", it is now known that those alterations did not affect the survival of the snakes. Currently, L. z. pulchra continues to be found in those areas of alteration, even using the disturbed rocks, which now lie on the ground and create additional (if different) places for thermo-regulation. Today, McGurty (pers. comm.) admits that the rocks are not central to the survival of the species, but merely a convenient place for thermoregulation. When small rock structure is absent, the snakes simply thermoregulate in burrows or under rocks that are too large to move.

Despite the illegal collection of up to a hundred individuals of this taxon in San Diego County each year, the sheer abundance of this snake in that area ( estimates 15,000 individuals within the favored collecting area alone) and the small number of optimum days for such collection (approximately 10–15 per year) has allowed for a continued population to exist and thrive. Those who have monitored the area for over 20 years (since the original commercial collection took place in the 1970s) have seen no significant depletion in snakes; however, there has actually been a small increase in numbers. While certain easily-collected sites exist in San Diego County, the vast majority of this snake's range and habitat are unaffected by collectors due to different habitat makeup (i.e. chaparral, coastal sage, sandstone, oak-woodland, and large riparian zones with little searchable habitat). The current estimate is that nearly 2,000,000 of these snakes exist within all the habitat they occupy in southern California, and in light of the DNA analysis by which lumps L. z. pulchra with L. z. parvirubra, the probable population exceeds 5 million snakes. Most of those serpents live within terrain that is roadless and inaccessible to collectors. Therefore, the protection of this taxon based on fears of over-collection is unfounded. A better system would be to protect the two populations in San Diego County that are at greatest risk from over-collection, or place a small bag-limit on the subspecies and encourage captive-breeding by hobbyists to supply those who wish to own L. z. pulchra. This would remove the need for illegal collection of wild snakes, and quickly reduce the value of the serpents as more and more become available in the form of captive-bred offspring. That program has worked well for the Rosy Boa and California Kingsnake.

== Sources ==
- California Department of Fish and Game - Habitat Conservation Planning Branch report
