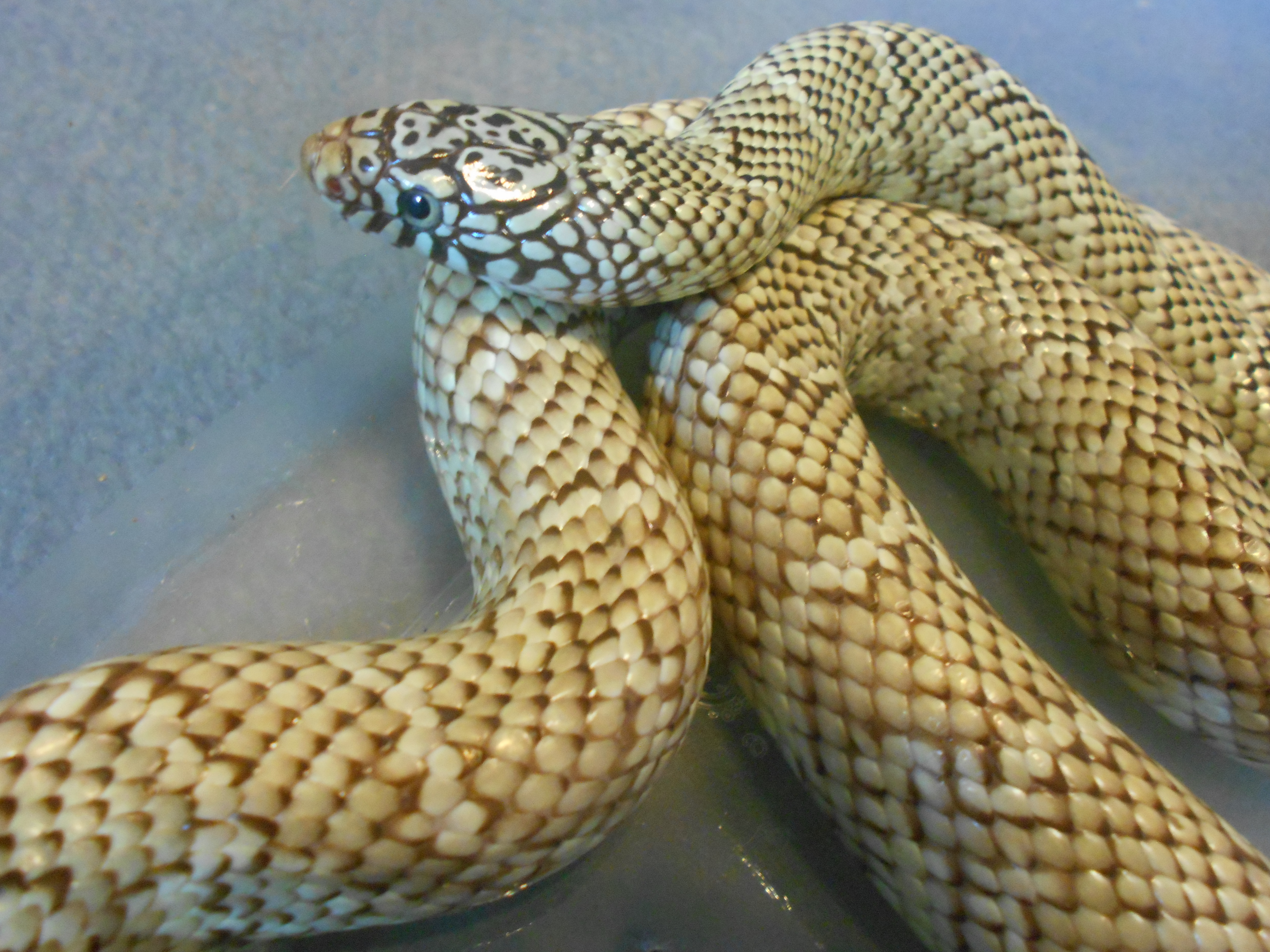

Scientific classification
- Kingdom: Animalia
- Phylum: Chordata
- Class: Reptilia
- Order: Squamata
- Suborder: Serpentes
- Family: Colubridae
- Genus: Lampropeltis
- Species: L. getula
- Subspecies: L. g. brooksi

Trinomial name
- Lampropeltis getula brooksi Barbour, 1919

= Lampropeltis getula brooksi =

Subspecies of snake

Lampropeltis getula brooksi (also known as Brooks' kingsnake) is a subspecies of nonvenomous snake in the family Colubridae. Lampropeltis getula brooksi is one of several subspecies of Lampropeltis getula.

== Etymology ==
The subspecific name, brooksi, is in honor of American zoologist Winthrop Sprague Brooks (1887–1965).

== Geographic range ==
L. g. brooksi is found in southern Florida.
