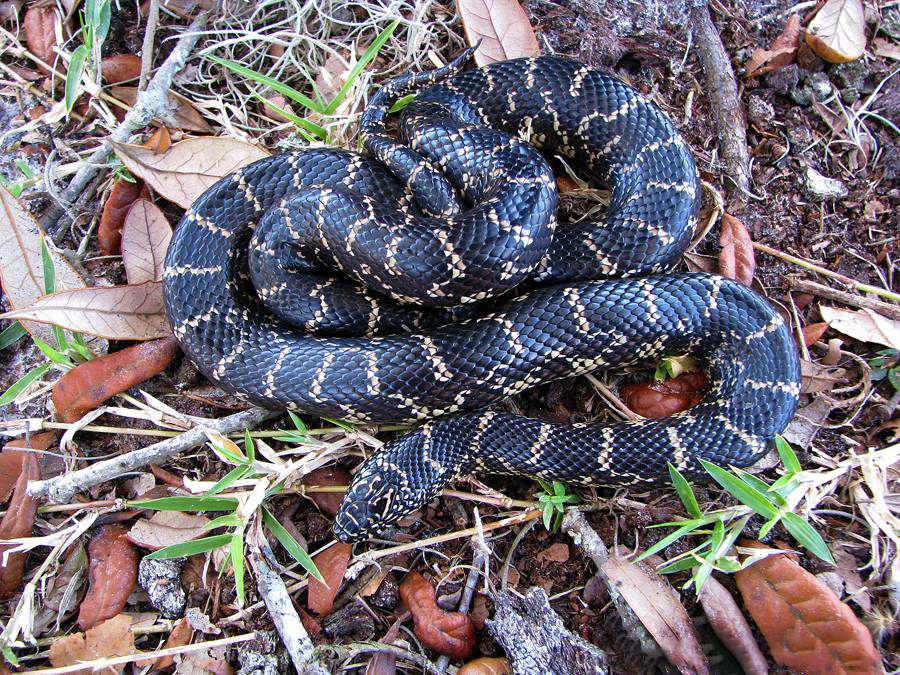

Scientific classification
- Kingdom: Animalia
- Phylum: Chordata
- Class: Reptilia
- Order: Squamata
- Suborder: Serpentes
- Family: Colubridae
- Genus: Lampropeltis
- Species: L. getula
- Subspecies: L. g. floridana

Trinomial name
- Lampropeltis getula floridana (Holbrook, 1838)

= Florida kingsnake =

Subspecies of snake

Lampropeltis getula floridana or the Florida kingsnake is a snake subspecies native to southern Florida. On average, they grow between 3.5–5 ft but 6 ft individuals have been recorded.

== Care ==
Like other kingsnakes, this species is relatively easy to care for. They can be housed in a 20–40 gallon aquarium with:

- Aspen shavings
- Cypress mulch
- Coconut fiber/coir
- Coconut chip
- Organic topsoil (fertilizer-free)
- Topsoil/sand mixes
- Bioactive forest-floor mixes

Avoid any pine or cedar based substrate as they can get into the scales and lead to infection

The temperature should be around 84F-90F degrees during the day, and nighttime temperatures should range between 68F and 75F degrees. Like other snakes commonly kept in captivity, they should feed on pinkie or fuzzie mice as babies, then gradually increase in size until the snake reaches adulthood, which by then they should be eating large mice.

== Gallery ==
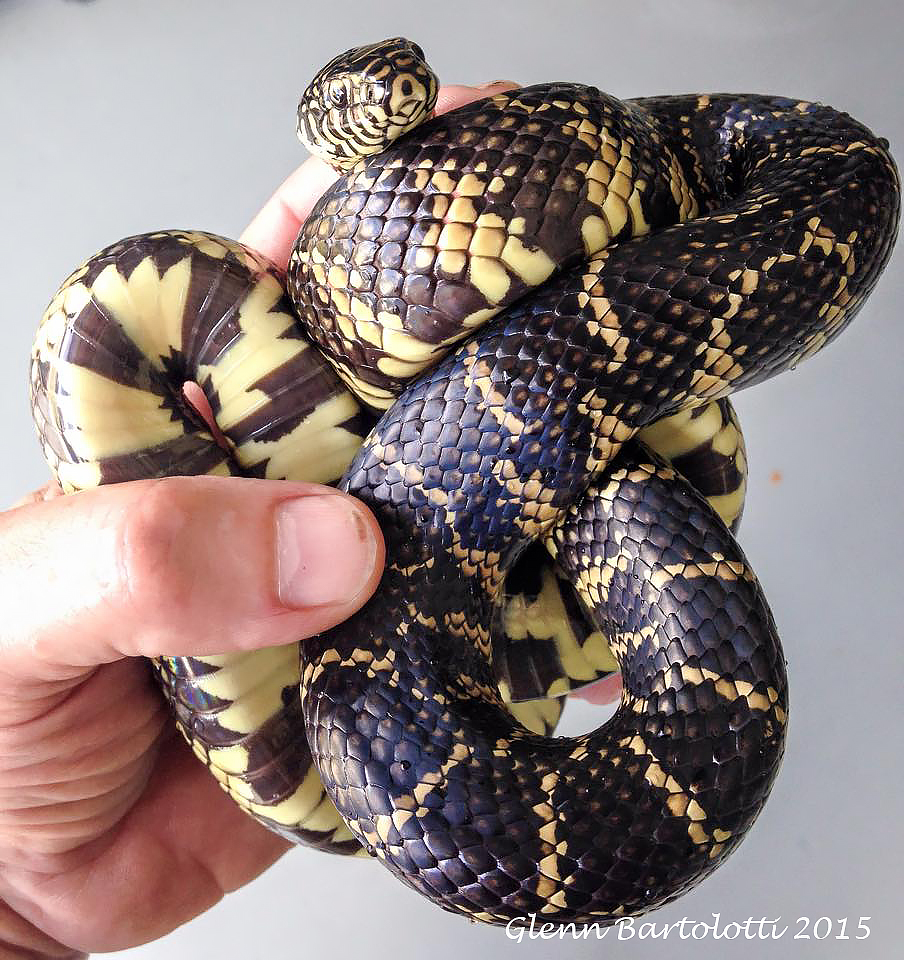
Adult male from South Florida

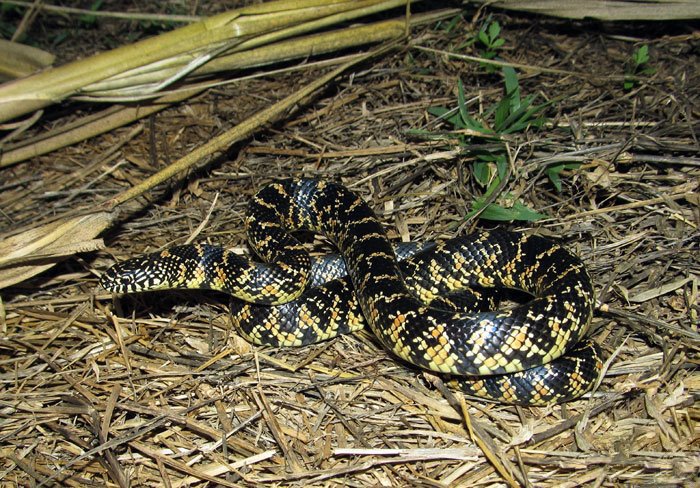
