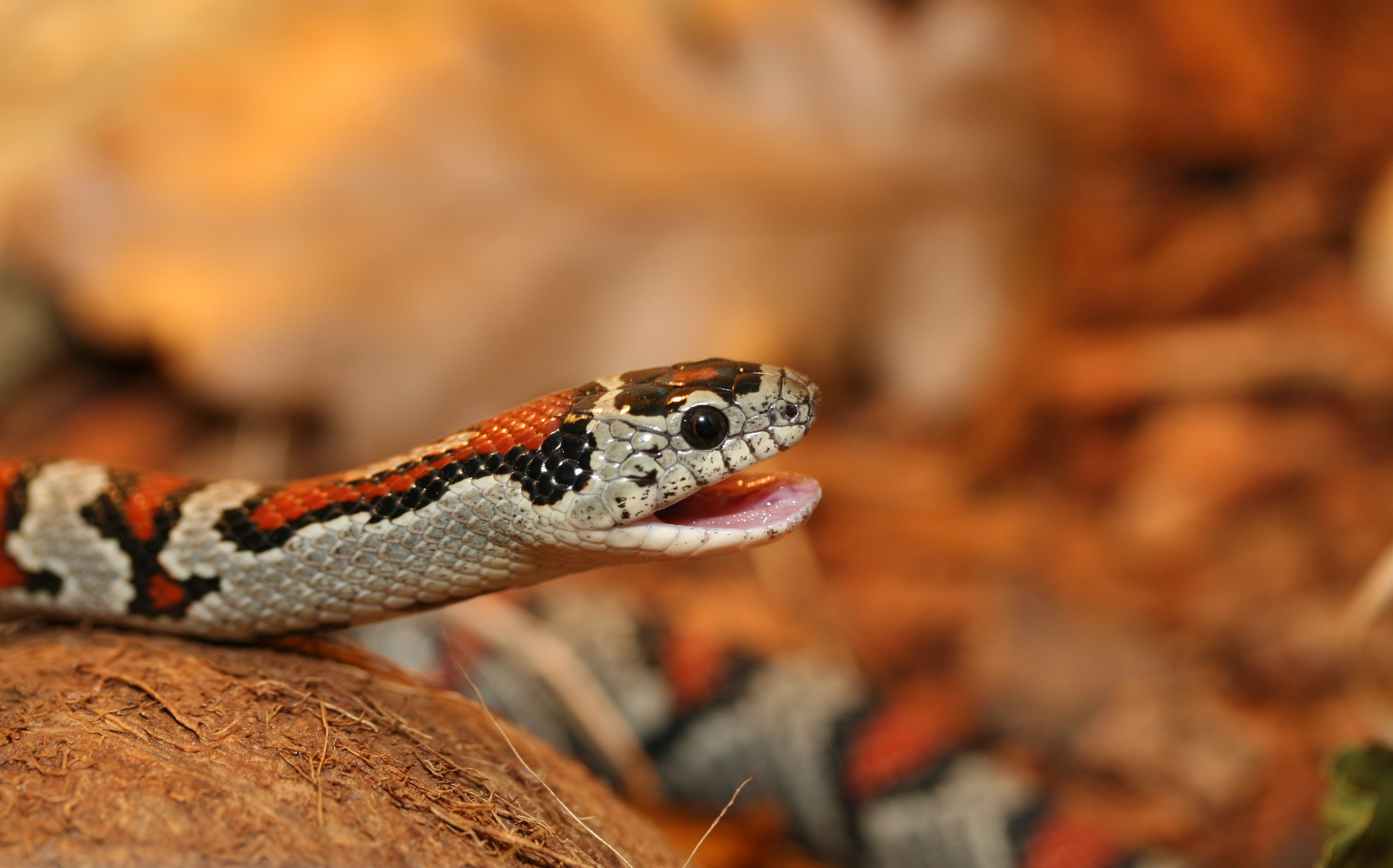
- Lampropeltis mexicana greeri

Conservation status
- Least Concern (IUCN 3.1)

Scientific classification
- Kingdom: Animalia
- Phylum: Chordata
- Class: Reptilia
- Order: Squamata
- Suborder: Serpentes
- Family: Colubridae
- Genus: Lampropeltis
- Species: L. mexicana

Binomial name
- Lampropeltis mexicana (Garman, 1884)

= Lampropeltis mexicana =

Species of snake

Lampropeltis mexicana, the Mexican kingsnake, is a colubrid snake that is endemic to Mexico.

== Description ==
The Mexican kingsnake is a smooth-skinned, slender, sub-cylindrical snake which is more flattened ventrally than most members of the genus Lampropeltis. It has a wide head, large eyes and a long tail. Adults grow to a length of about 140–200 cm (55–79 in). This snake has broad red saddle-shaped markings, bordered with black and separated by cream, brown or pinkish bars. The sequence of colors does not vary but the proportions and shades of the color bands are quite variable. The nominate subspecies has distinctive red markings and intricate patterning on its head. The species is known for sexual dichromatism, with the males being slightly more vividly colored than the females.

== Distribution and habitat ==
The Mexican kingsnake is endemic to northeastern Mexico. The nominate subspecies is found in the state of San Luis Potosí. The typical habitat of this snake is rocky hillsides, valleys and deserts in mountainous regions as well as woodlands, oak forests and grassy areas. Its altitudinal range is 1,300 to 2,400 m (4,265 to 7,874 ft) above sea level.

== Behavior ==
The Mexican kingsnake is a secretive, nocturnal species that is seldom seen, hiding under rocks and fallen trees by day. It feeds on reptiles, small mammals and amphibians, but its main prey is diurnal lizards. It is oviparous and lays a clutch of three to five eggs.

== Conservation ==
The IUCN has listed the Mexican kingsnake as being of "Least Concern". This is because it has a wide range and the population is presumed to be large and seems to be stable. It is sometimes misidentified as a venomous coral snake and killed by humans, but it otherwise faces no major threats. Part of its range occurs within the confines of the state of Santa Rosa protected area.
