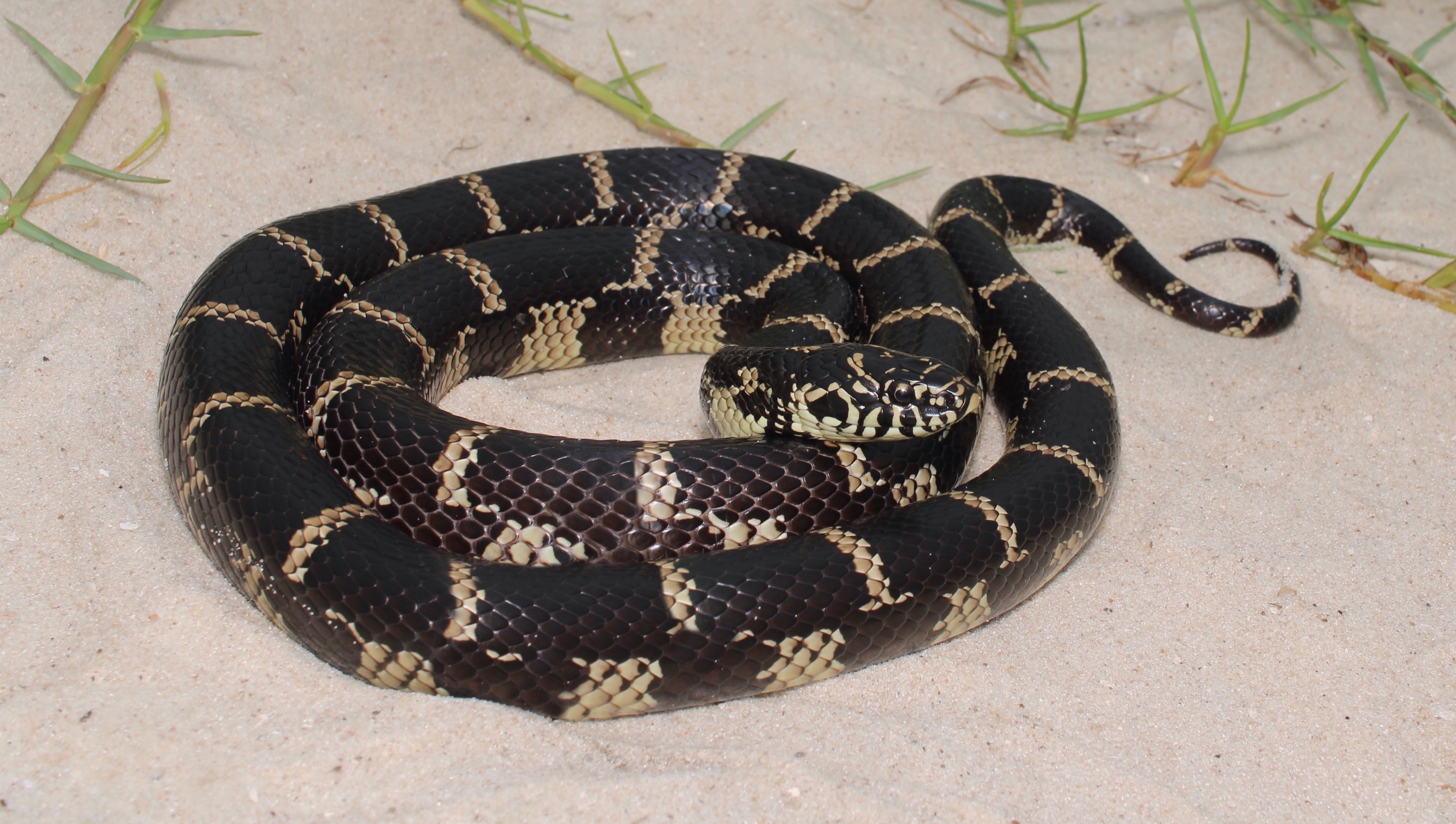
- This snake was found preying on a diamondback terrapin nest.

Conservation status
- Least Concern (IUCN 3.1)

Scientific classification
- Kingdom: Animalia
- Phylum: Chordata
- Class: Reptilia
- Order: Squamata
- Suborder: Serpentes
- Family: Colubridae
- Genus: Lampropeltis
- Species: L. getula

Binomial name
- Lampropeltis getula (Linnaeus, 1766)
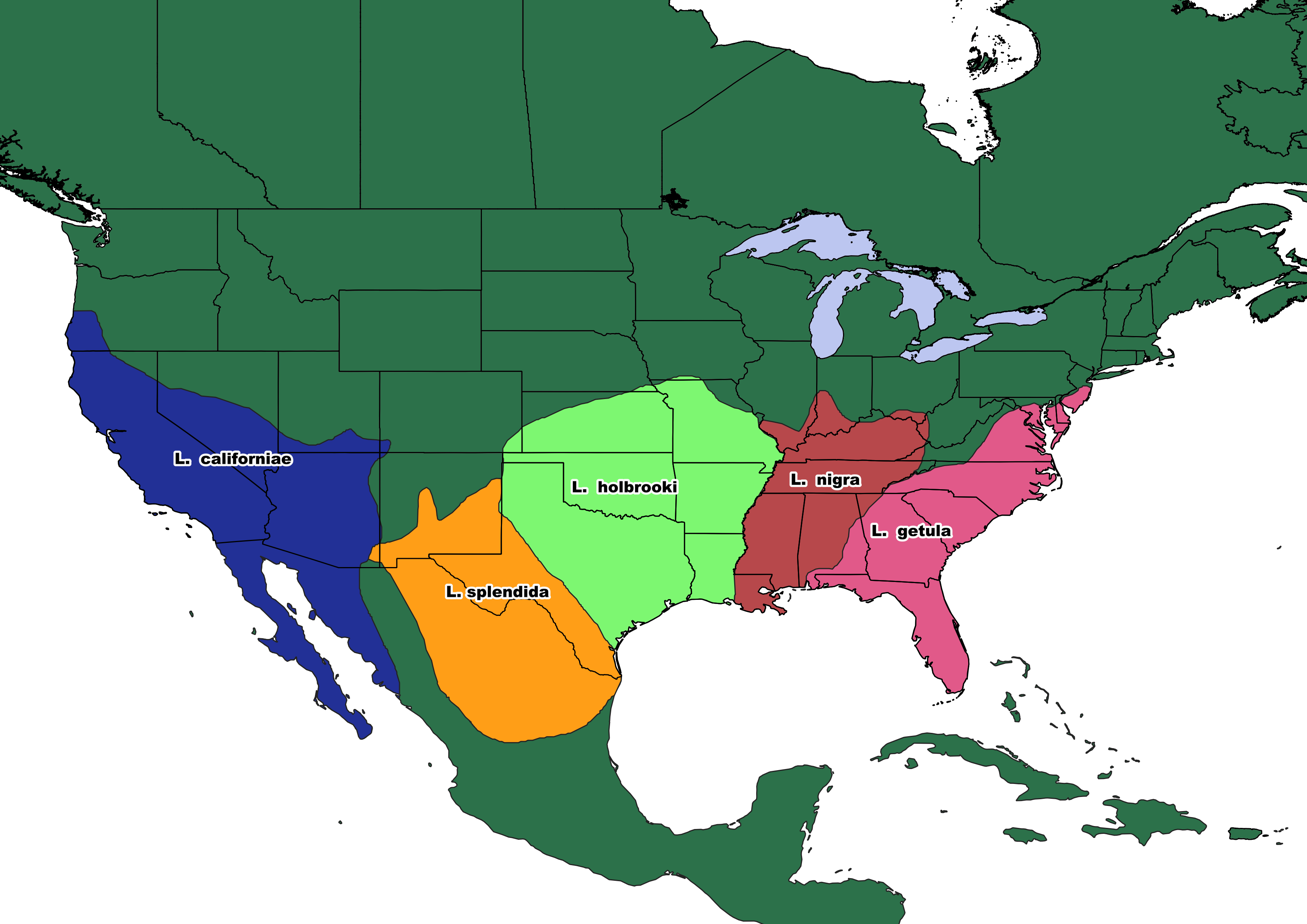

Synonyms
- Coluber getulus Linnaeus, 1766; Ophibolus getulus — Baird & Girard, 1853; Coronella Getulus — A.M.C. Duméril, Bibron & A.H.A. Duméril, 1854; Ophibolus getulus — Cope, 1875; Ophilobus [sic] getulus — Cope, 1892 (ex errore); Coronella getula — Boulenger, 1894; Triaeniopholis arenarius F. Werner, 1924; Lampropeltis getula goini Neill & Allen, 1949; Lampropeltis getula — Stebbins, 1985; Lampropeltis getula — Conant & Collins, 1991; Lampropeltis getula — Liner, 1994

= Lampropeltis getula =

Species of snake

Lampropeltis getula, commonly known as the eastern kingsnake, the common kingsnake, and the chain kingsnake, is a species of harmless snake in the subfamily Colubrinae of the family Colubridae. The species is native to the southeastern United States. It has long been a favorite among collectors. Four subspecies are recognized, including the nominate subspecies described here. Each of these taxa had previously been described as distinct species for more than a century.

== Description ==
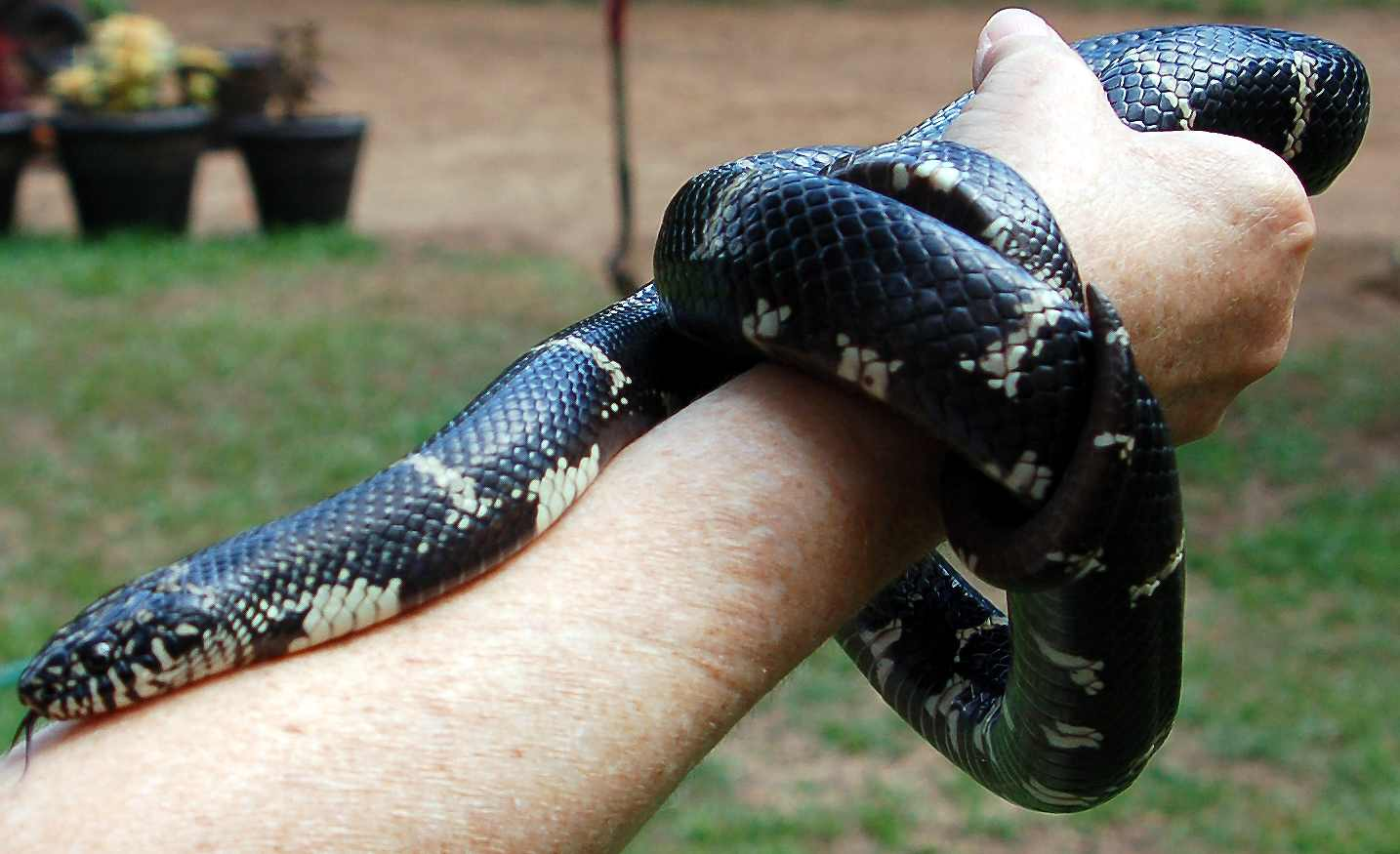
L. g. getula can be quite docile even when caught wild

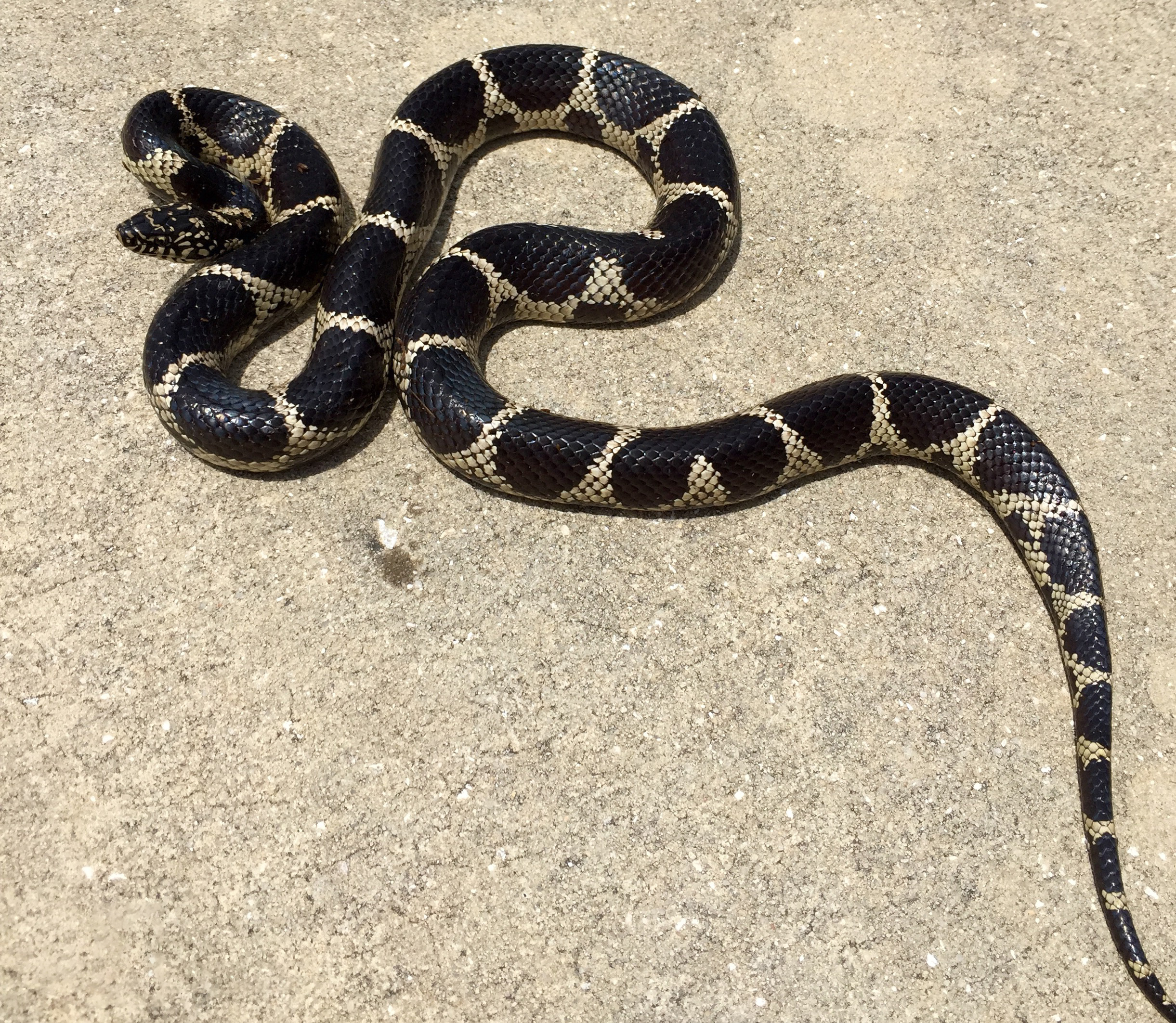
Florida kingsnake in Dixie County, Florida

Adult specimens of the speckled kingsnake, Lampropeltis getula holbrooki, are the smallest race at 91.5 cm (36.0 in) in snout-to-vent length (SVL) on average, while L. g. getula is the largest subspecies at 107 cm (42 in) SVL on average. Specimens up to 208.2 cm (82.0 in) in total length (including tail) have been recorded. Weight can vary from 285 g (10.1 oz) in a small specimen of 87.2 cm (34.3 in) in total length, to 2,268 g (80.0 oz) in large specimens, of over 153 cm (60 in) in total length.

The color pattern consists of a glossy black, blue black, or dark brown ground color, overlaid with a series of 23–52 white chain-like rings. Variation is found in their patterns across geographic ranges. Kingsnakes from the coastal plains have wider bands, while those found in mountainous areas have thinner bands or may be completely black.

== Common names ==
Common names for Lampropeltis getula include eastern kingsnake, common kingsnake, chain kingsnake, kingsnake, Carolina kingsnake, chain snake, bastard horn snake, black kingsnake, black moccasin, common chain snake, cow sucker, horse racer, master snake, North American kingsnake, oakleaf rattler, pied snake, pine snake, racer, rattlesnake pilot, thunder-and-lightning snake, thunderbolt, thunder snake, wamper, wampum snake.

== Geographic range ==
Lampropeltis getula is found in the southeastern United States from southern New Jersey to Florida.

== Habitat ==
The preferred habitats of Lampropeltis getula are open areas, particularly grassland, but also chaparral, oak woodland, abandoned farms, desert, low mountains, sand, and any type of riparian zone, including swamps, canals, and streams. A study on the habitat use of the eastern kingsnake found that overall it prefers and can be found in sites with a thick layer of leaf litter and dense shrubbery. From observations, researchers found that 79% of tracked specimen spent the majority of their time concealed under the cover of soil and leaf litter.

Although commonly described as diurnal, some reports suggest that the eastern kingsnake is crepuscular or nocturnal during the hottest parts of the year. It will often retreat into rodent burrows as nocturnal retreats.

It has been found that eastern kingsnake home ranges often show little-to-no overlap.

Some studies show that the eastern kingsnake (L. g. getula) is territorial, especially males, which will engage invading snakes in combat if their territory is threatened.

== Diet ==
Lampropeltis getula eats other snakes, including venomous snakes such as the copperhead (Agkistrodon contortrix), which is responsible for more venomous snakebites than any other in the United States, as well as coral snakes (genera Micruroides and Micrurus), the massasauga (Sistrurus catenatus), and other rattlesnakes (genera Crotalus and Sistrurus). Nonvenomous snakes preyed upon include the common garter snake (Thamnophis sirtalis), the common watersnake (Nerodia sipedon), the ring-necked snake (Diadophis punctatus), the smooth earth snake (Virginia valeriae), and the worm snake (Carphophis amoenus).

It has developed a hunting technique to avoid being bitten by clamping down on the jaws of the venomous prey, but even if envenomated, it is immune. It also eats amphibians, turtle eggs, bird eggs including those of the northern bobwhite (Colinus virginianus), lizards such as the five-lined skink (Plestiodon fasciatus), and small mammals such as the white-footed mouse (Peromyscus leucopus), which it kills by constriction.

Due to their diet of other snake species, kingsnakes of the genus Lampropeltis are a key factor in the spread of ophidiomycosis. This is a relatively new snake fungal disease originating from the fungus, Ophidiomyces ophiodiicola. This disease has a variety of impacts on snakes and the extent of this impact is still being researched.

== Reproduction ==
Lampropeltis getula is oviparous. Adult females lay up to several dozen eggs that hatch after 2.0–2.5 months of incubation. Hatchlings are brightly colored and feed on small snakes, lizards, and rodents. The eastern kingsnake (L. g. getula) is active from April–October in most parts of its habitat range and breeding occurs in the spring months. Neck-biting is a common behavior when mating.

== In captivity ==
Long a favorite among collectors, Lampropeltis getula does well in captivity, living to 25 years or more. Some of the most popular subspecies of the common kingsnake kept in captivity are the California, Brooks', Florida, and Mexican black kingsnakes.

== Subspecies ==
Subspecies	Authority	Common name	Range
L. g. brooksi	Barbour, 1919	Brooks's kingsnake
L. g. floridana	Blanchard, 1919	Florida kingsnake
L. g. getula	(Linnaeus, 1766)	Eastern kingsnake
L. g. meansi	Krysko & Judd, 2006	Apalachicola Lowlands kingsnake	the Apalachicola Lowlands, Florida
