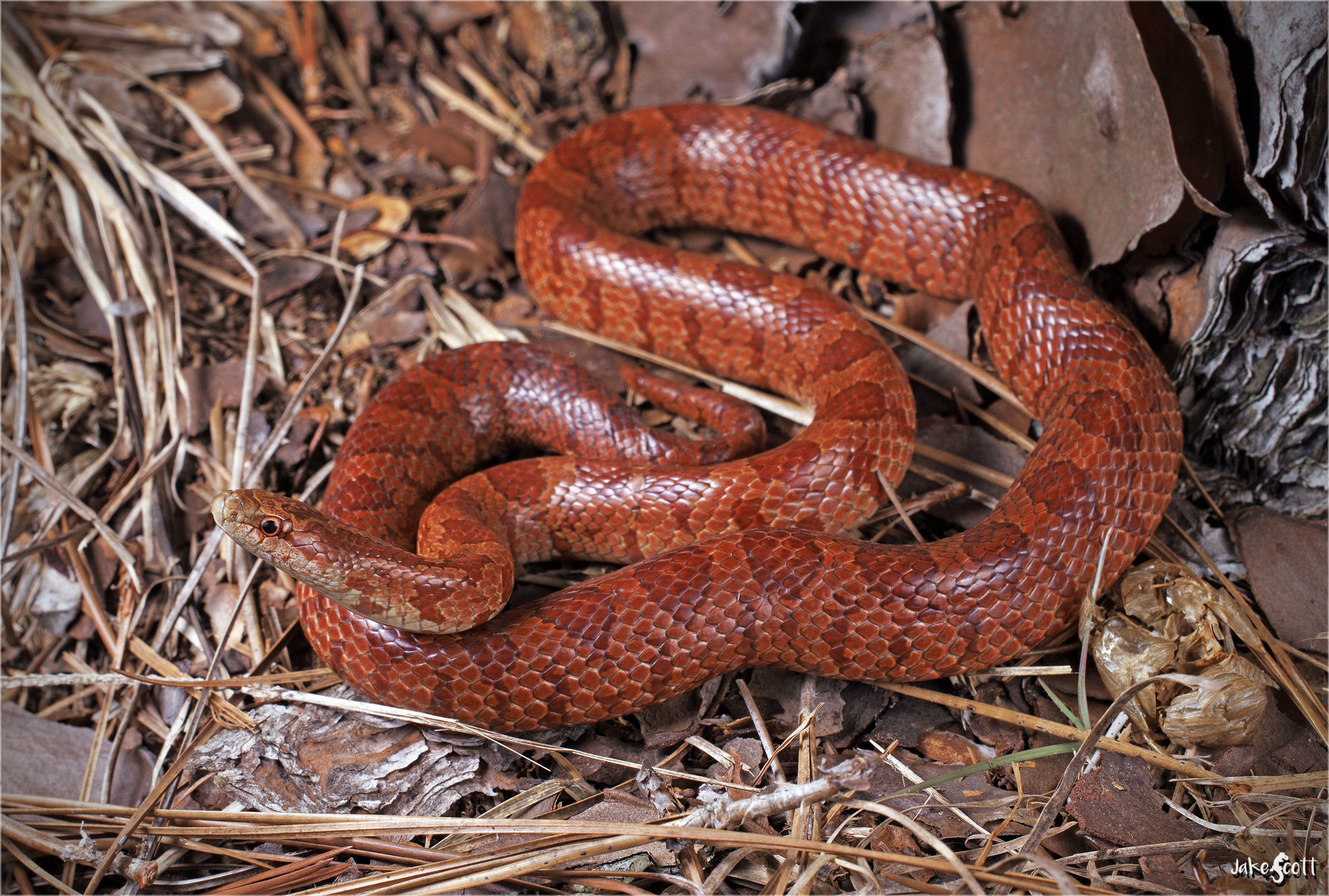
- mole kingsnake, Lampropeltis rhombomaculata

Scientific classification
- Kingdom: Animalia
- Phylum: Chordata
- Class: Reptilia
- Order: Squamata
- Suborder: Serpentes
- Family: Colubridae
- Genus: Lampropeltis
- Species: L. rhombomaculata

Binomial name
- Lampropeltis rhombomaculata (Holbrook, 1840)
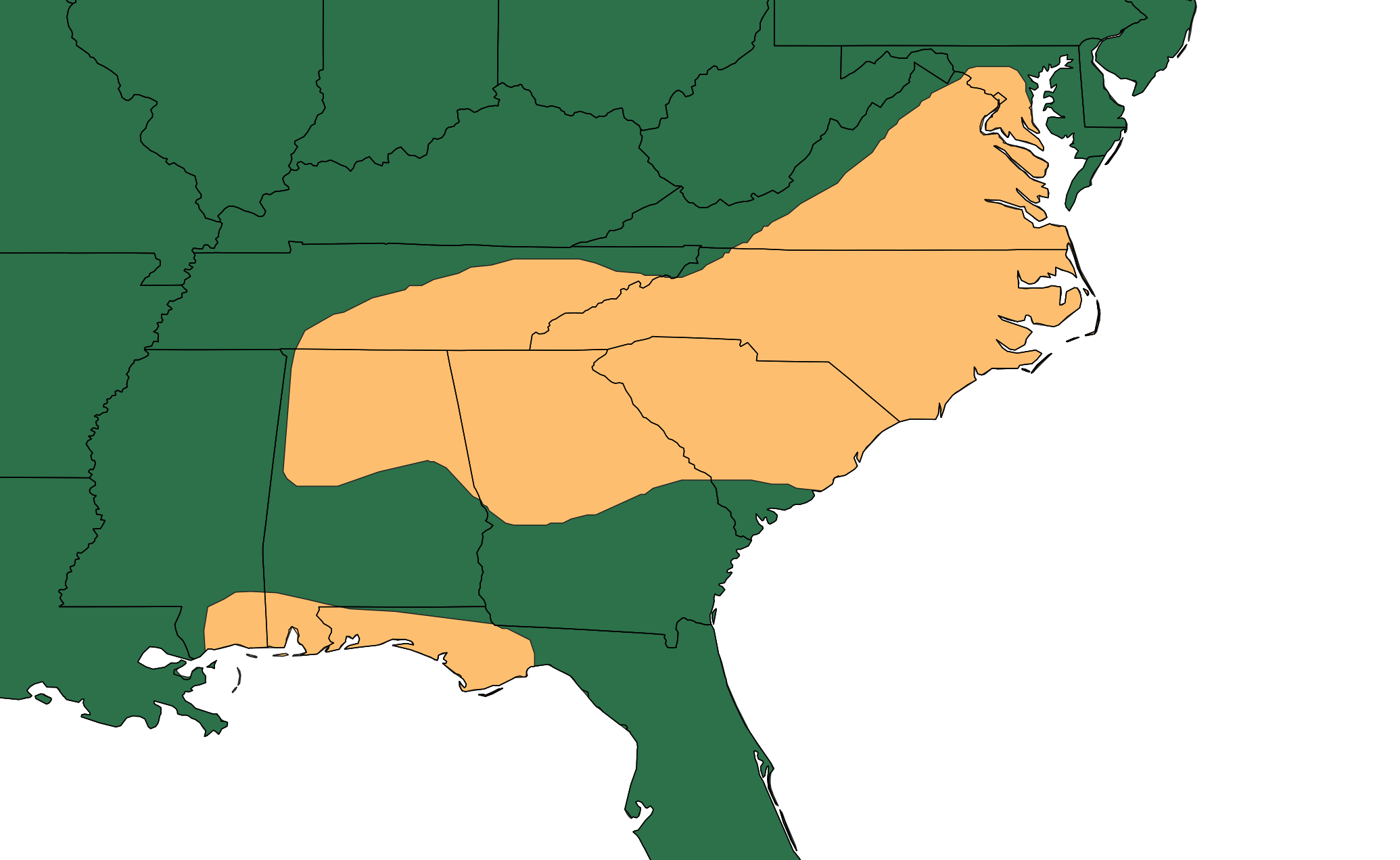

Synonyms
- Coluber rhombo-maculatus Holbrook, 1840; Coronella rhombomaculata — Holbrook, 1842; Ophibolus rhombomaculatus — Baird & Girard, 1853; Lampropeltis rhombomaculata — Cope, 1860; Lampropeltis calligaster rhombomaculata — Conant & Collins, 1991; Lampropeltis rhombomaculata — Beane, 2019

= Lampropeltis rhombomaculata =

Subspecies of snake

Lampropeltis rhombomaculata, commonly known as the mole kingsnake or the brown kingsnake, is a species of snake in the family Colubridae. It is a relatively medium-sized snake that occupies a variety of habitats from Baltimore, Maryland, south through the Florida Panhandle and west into Mississippi and Tennessee.

== Geographic range ==
The mole kingsnake is found in the southeastern United States, but is absent from the Appalachian Mountains. Their home-range stretches from Maryland down to Florida and west to Mississippi.

== Etymology ==
The generic name, Lampropeltis, is derived from Greek Lampros, meaning "shiny", and pelta, meaning "shield", likely in reference to the genus' smooth and shiny dorsal scales. The specific name, rhomomaculata, is a combination of the Greek word rhombos and Latin maculata to form "rhombus spotted", referring to the 52 rhomboidical dorsal blotches described in the species.

== Description ==
Lampropeltis rhombomaculata is generally light brown or gray in color, with dark brown, orange, or reddish-brown blotching down the length of its body. It is capable of growing to a total length (including tail) of 30–40 inches (76.2–101.6 cm). It is easily mistaken for the milk snake and the venomous copperhead, which both share the same type of habitat, and can have similar markings. Some specimens have their markings faded, to appear almost a solid brown color. Juveniles are generally more vivid in markings and coloration, with small reddish-colored markings on the head.

== Habitat and behavior ==
The preferred habitat of the mole kingsnake is open fields with loose, dry soil, typically on the edge of a forested region. Its diet consists primarily of rodents, but it will also consume lizards, frogs and occasionally other snakes. It is nonvenomous, and typically docile. Like most colubrids, if harassed it will vibrate its tail rapidly. This snake is very secretive and very fossorial and rarely seen above ground during the day unless it is forced out by heavy rains. The mole kingsnake is mainly nocturnal and commonly seen on paved roads at night.

This species has been observed to ingest prey whole and headfirst, even prey with a diameter over 90% of the diameter of the snake's head. This is thought to be an inherited behavior.

== Reproduction ==
Male and female mole kingsnakes mate around May–June during late spring to early summer. Females leave behind pheromone trails for males to sense through their forked tongues. They have been seen to use their tongues to signal to mates by flicking them at up to one time per second and by jerking their bodies. Mating events in a laboratory setting were recorded to have lasted over two hours. Males have been seen biting females during copulation most likely so that their hemipene stays in place. After mating, females choose their nesting sites underground or in rotting logs and leave their 10–12 eggs to hatch in the summer. The mother does not stay behind to nurture her offspring, usually leaving right after she laid the eggs. It takes about ten days for the hatched snakes to be fully independent.

The hatchlings and eggs of L. rhombomaculata are both of smaller average size than those of L. calligaster.
