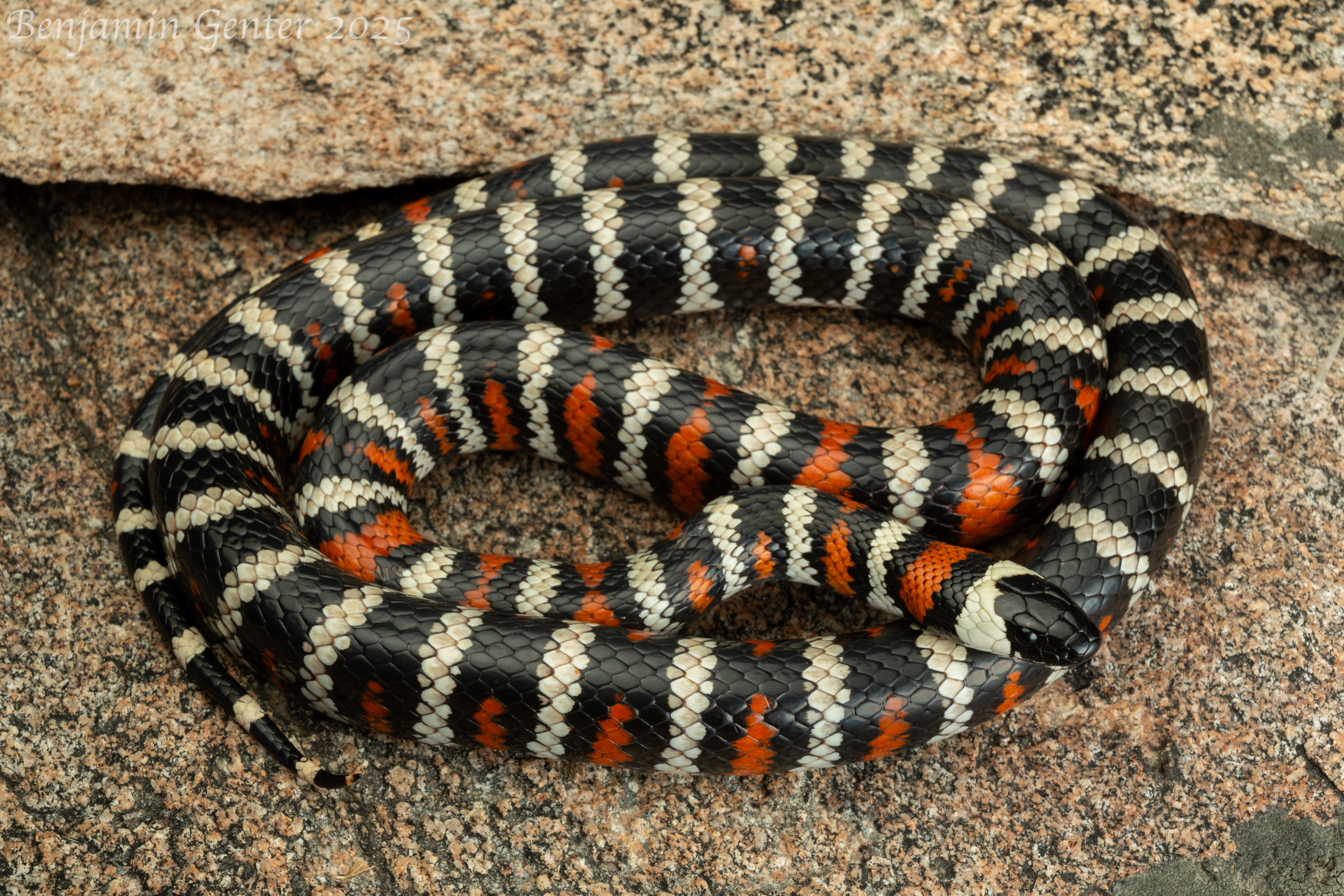
- Lampropeltis zonata parvirubra

Conservation status
- Least Concern (IUCN 3.1)

Scientific classification
- Kingdom: Animalia
- Phylum: Chordata
- Class: Reptilia
- Order: Squamata
- Suborder: Serpentes
- Family: Colubridae
- Genus: Lampropeltis
- Species: L. zonata

Binomial name
- Lampropeltis zonata (Lockington, 1876 ex Blainville, 1835)

Synonyms
- Coluber (Zacholus) zonatus Blainville, 1835; Bellophis zonatus Lockington, 1876; Ophibolus getulus multicinctus Yarrow, 1882; Coronella zonata — Boulenger, 1894; Lampropeltis zonata — Fitch, 1936

= California mountain kingsnake =

Species of snake

The California mountain kingsnake (Lampropeltis zonata) is a species of nonvenomous colubrid snake that is endemic to North America. It is a coral snake mimic, having a similar pattern consisting of red, black, and yellow on its body, but the snake is completely harmless. Seven subspecies are recognized, with five found in the U.S., including the nominotypical subspecies, and two in Mexico.

== Geographic range ==
The California mountain kingsnake is endemic to western North America. It ranges from extreme southern Washington state, where it has a disjunct population, through Oregon and California, to northern Baja California. The majority of its range lies within the state of California, which is the reason for its common name.

== Description ==
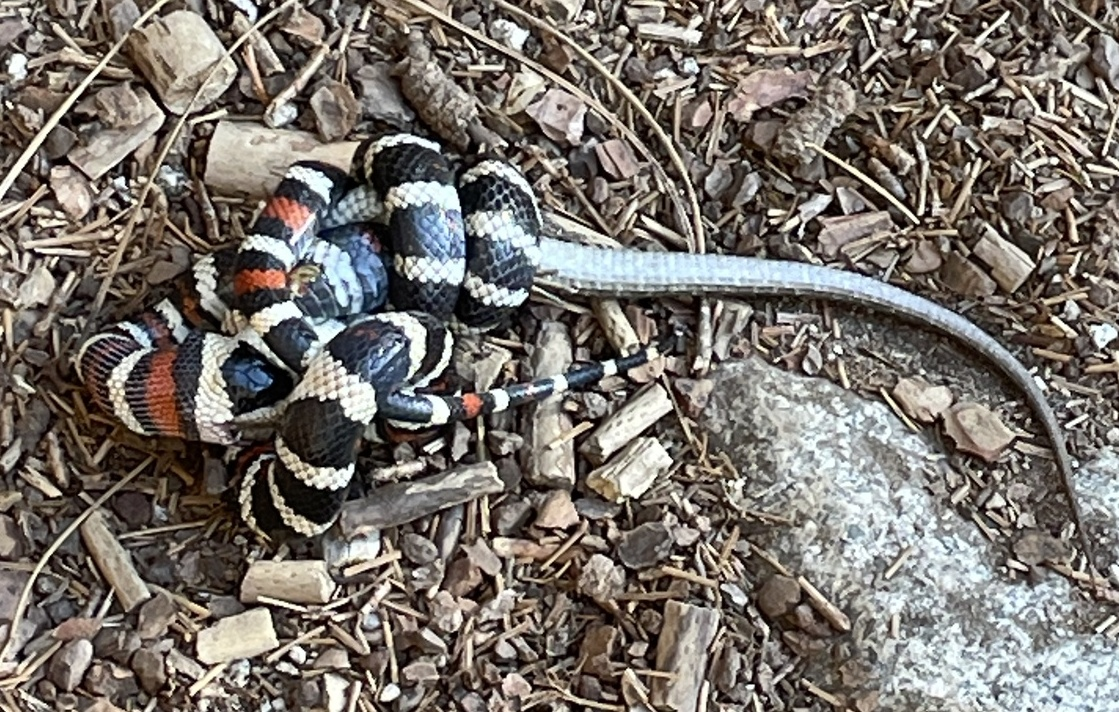
Eating a lizard, in California

California mountain kingsnakes have a banded pattern that consists of red, black, and white crossbands. The bands are always arranged in the same order with each red crossband being surrounded by two black crossbands, forming what is called a triad. Each triad is separated from the next triad by a white crossband, or in some examples by a cream or yellow crossband. Some individuals may have reduced amounts of red pigment, and rare individuals may have virtually no red bands at all. One population from Isla Todos Santos always lacks the red crossbands and is instead uniformly banded with black and white, similar in appearance to the related California kingsnake.

== Habitat ==
As its common name suggests, the California mountain kingsnake is found mostly in the mountains within its geographic range.

== Subspecies ==
The following subspecies are recognized:

- Lampropeltis zonata multicincta (Yarrow, 1882)
- Lampropeltis zonata multifasciata (Bocourt, 1886)
- Lampropeltis zonata parvirubra Zweifel, 1952
- Lampropeltis zonata pulchra Zweifel, 1952
- Lampropeltis zonata zonata (Lockington, 1876 ex Blainville, 1835)
- Lampropeltis zonata agalma (Van Denburgh & Slevin, 1923)
- Lampropeltis zonata herrerae (Van Denburgh & Slevin, 1923)
