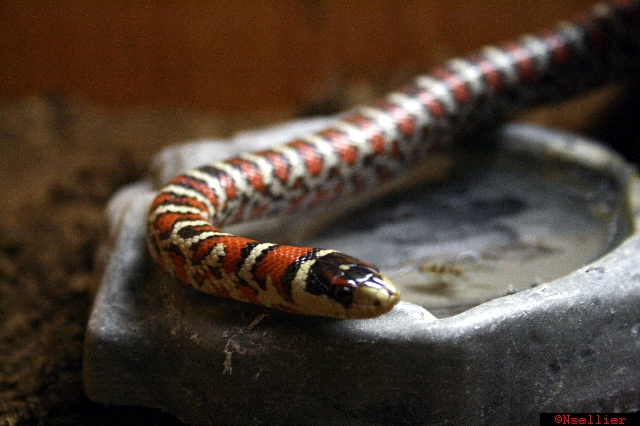

Conservation status
- Least Concern (IUCN 3.1)

Scientific classification
- Kingdom: Animalia
- Phylum: Chordata
- Class: Reptilia
- Order: Squamata
- Suborder: Serpentes
- Family: Colubridae
- Genus: Lampropeltis
- Species: L. knoblochi

Binomial name
- Lampropeltis knoblochi Taylor, 1940
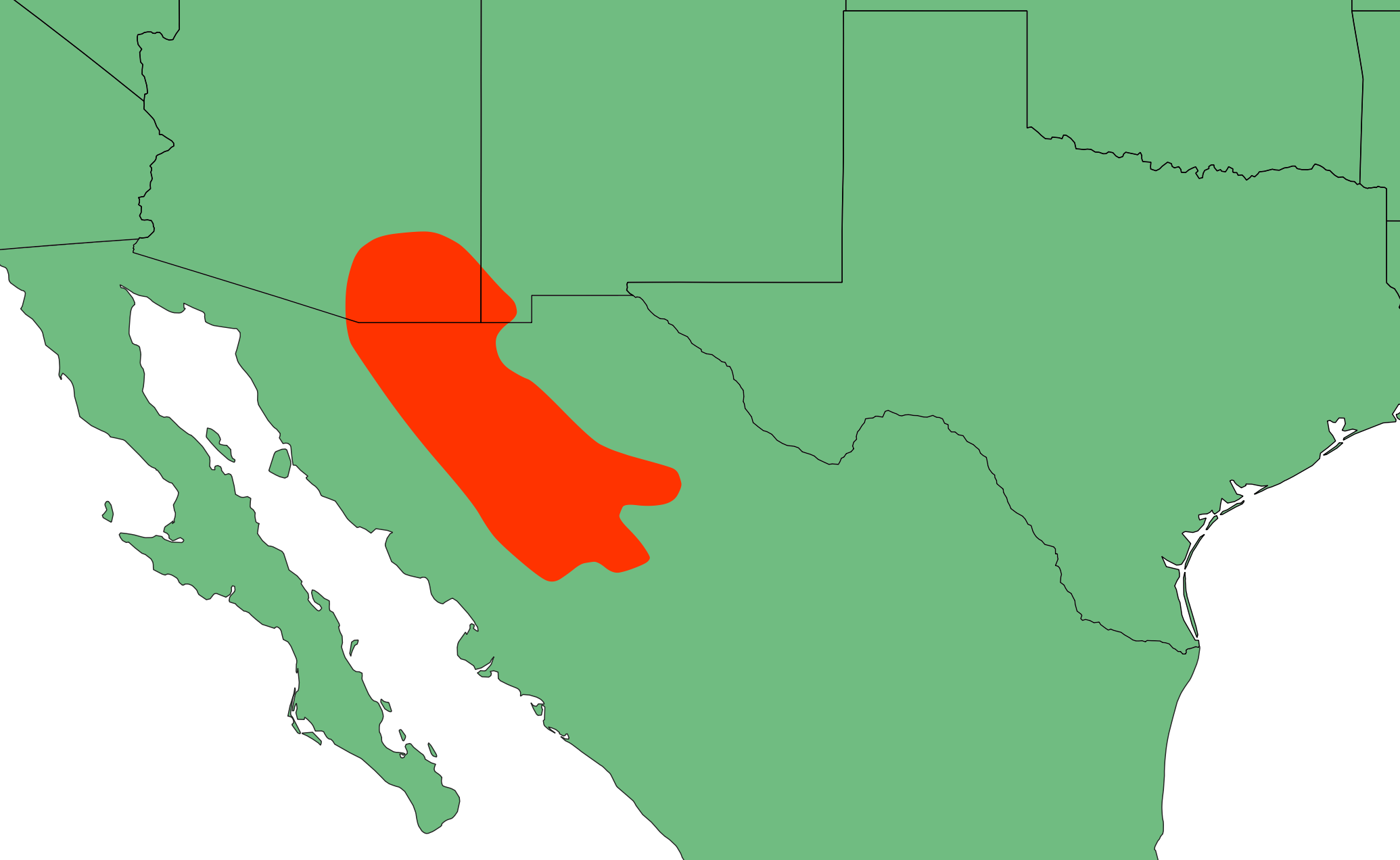

= Lampropeltis knoblochi =

Species of snake

Lampropeltis knoblochi, commonly known as the Madrean mountain kingsnake, Knobloch's mountain kingsnake , or the Chihuahuan mountain kingsnake, is a species of colubrid snake residing in western North America.

It is a coral snake mimic, having nearly the same pattern on its body, except instead of yellow crossbands, the kingsnake has white crossbands.

It lives mostly on the mountains of its relatively small Sonoran Desert region, in Sonora, Mexico.
