= W. Frank Blair =

William Franklin Blair (25 June 1912 – 1984) was a zoologist and president of the Ecological Society of America.

== Life ==
Blair was born in Dayton, Texas. He was the eldest of five children of Percy Franklin and Mona Clyde (Patrick) Blair. In 1916, his family moved to Oklahoma, where Blair graduated from Tulsa Central High School in 1930, then from the University of Tulsa in 1934 with a degree in zoology. He married Fern Antell, a librarian at the university, on October 25, 1933.

== Career ==
Blair earned his master's degree at the University of Florida in 1935, and completed his doctorate at the University of Michigan in 1938. His advisor was Lee R. Dice

He began to work at the University of Michigan's Laboratory of Vertebrate Biology in 1937. He studied the home ranges of small mammals, as well as their pelage color which match both dark and light soils in the White Sands, New Mexico. In 1942, Blair joined the military service in the Air Force Altitude Training and Survival programs during the WWII, returning to Michigan briefly afterwards. Blair became professor at the University of Texas in 1955, where he remained until retirement in 1982 as professor emeritus in zoology. Blair became a prominent professor as the first director of the university's Brackenridge Field Laboratory and chairman of the budget council for the Marine Science Institute. Blair's academic life focused on herpetology evolution, but included ecological land classification. The latter project with the International Biological Program, a fifty-seven-nation project sponsored by the International Council of Scientific Unions, which led to a better understanding of the world's ecosystems. From 1968 to 1972 Blair was chairman of the United States National Committee of the IBP. Blair was a founder of the Southwestern Association of Naturalists, becoming its president. He also served as president of the American Institute of Biological Sciences, the Ecological Society of America, the Society for the Study of Evolution, and the Texas Herpetological Society, He served as vice-president of American Society of Ichthyologists and Herpetologists and of the Texas Academy of Science.

== Works ==
Between 1935 and 1982 Blair published or edited some 162 papers, articles, and books.

- Vertebrates of the United States (1957)
- The Rusty Lizard: A Population Study (1960)
- Evolution in the Genus Bufo (1972)
- Big Biology: The U.S.- International Biological Program (1977)
- The Biotic Provineces of Texas. (1950)

== Awards and legacy ==
Blair received many awards.

- Joseph Priestley Award from Dickinson College (1977)
- Fellow of the American Association for the Advancement of Science

He is commemorated by the W. Frank Blair Eminent Naturalist Award.

Blair and his wife donated ten acres, on the site of Fort Colorado, to the Travis Audubon Society as a natural preserve for ecological studies known as Blair Woods.

The "blairi" color morph of the gray-banded kingsnake is named after Frank Blair. It was originally described as a new species, Lampropeltis blairi, later considered a subspecies, Lampropeltis alterna blairi, and then determined to be a color morph.
