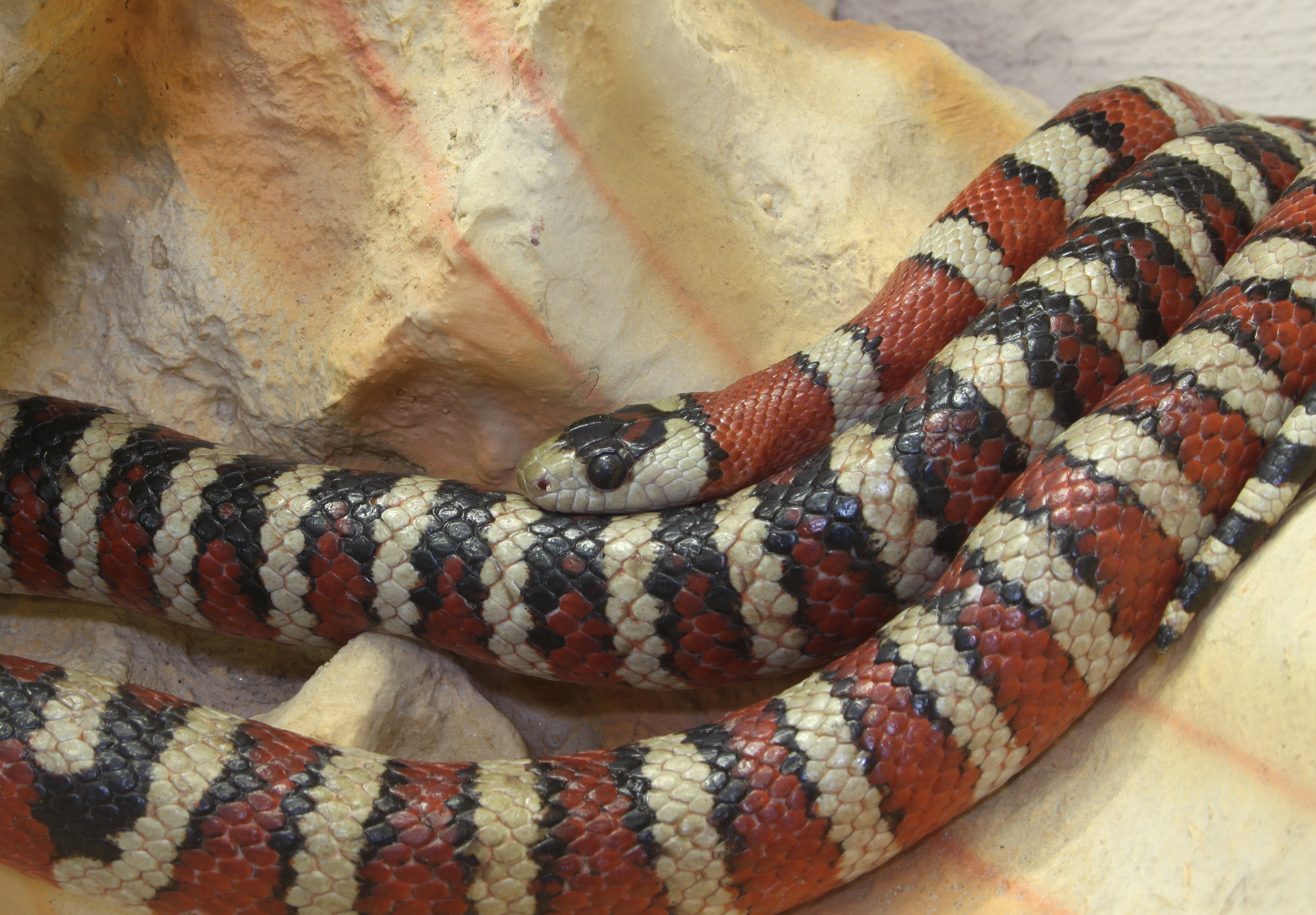
- Lampropeltis pyromelana woodini

Conservation status
- Least Concern (IUCN 3.1)

Scientific classification
- Kingdom: Animalia
- Phylum: Chordata
- Class: Reptilia
- Order: Squamata
- Suborder: Serpentes
- Family: Colubridae
- Genus: Lampropeltis
- Species: L. pyromelana

Binomial name
- Lampropeltis pyromelana (Cope, 1866)
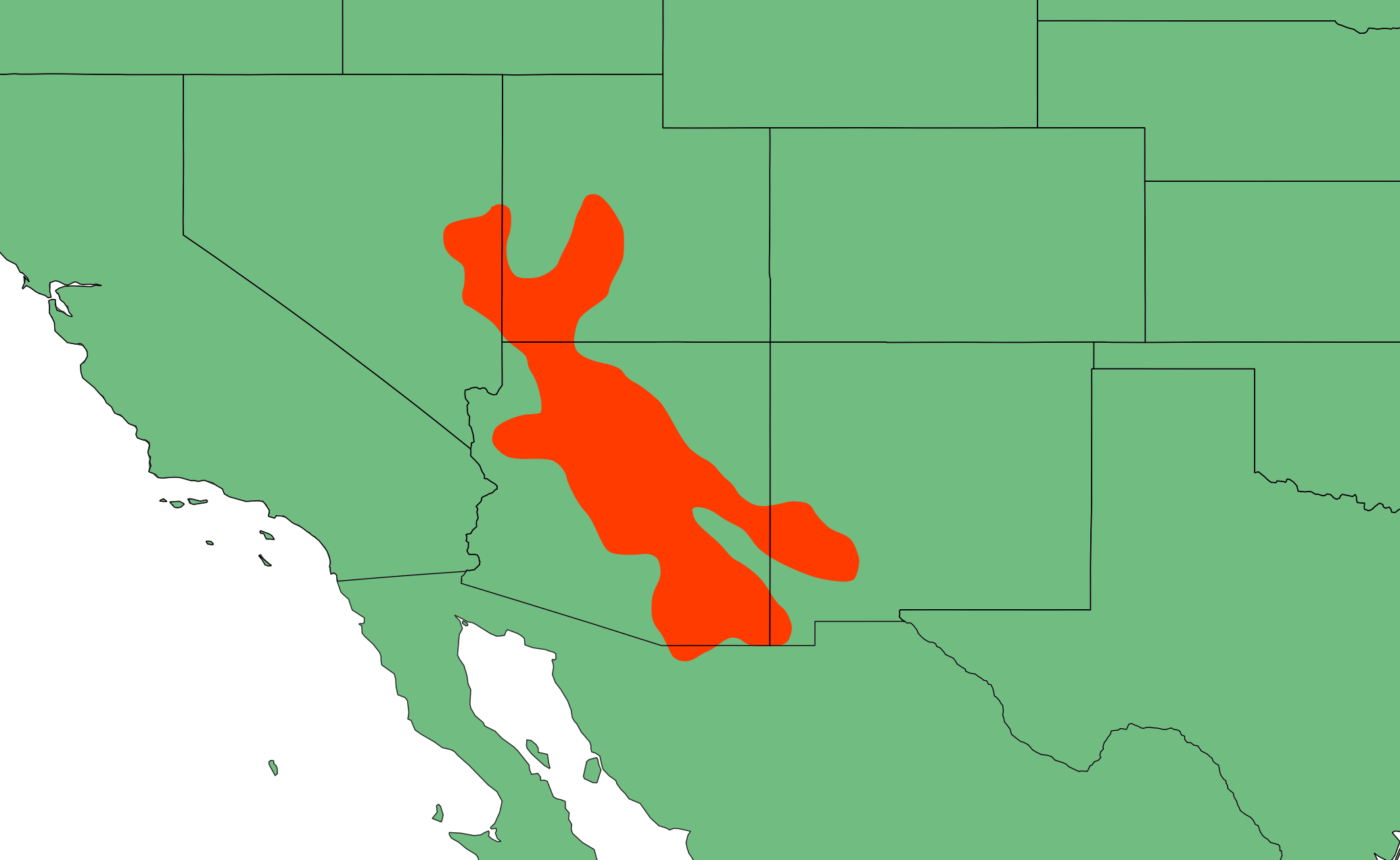

= Lampropeltis pyromelana =

Species of snake

Lampropeltis pyromelana, the Sonoran mountain kingsnake or Arizona mountain kingsnake, is a species of snake native to the southwestern United States. It can grow up to 36 inches (910 mm) in length.

== Distribution and habitat ==
Within Arizona, L. pyromelana has a discontinuous range extending from the extreme northwestern corner of the state, across the central mountain ranges and the Mogollon Rim, into the "sky island" mountain ranges of the southeast. They can be found at elevations ranging from 3,000–9,000 feet (910–2,740 m) in a variety of habitats from chaparral to conifer forests, often near streams or springs and associated with juniper woodland.

== Ecology ==
Lampropeltis pyromelana feeds on lizards, rodents and nestling birds. It tends to spend the daytime among rocks, logs, or dense clumps of vegetation.
