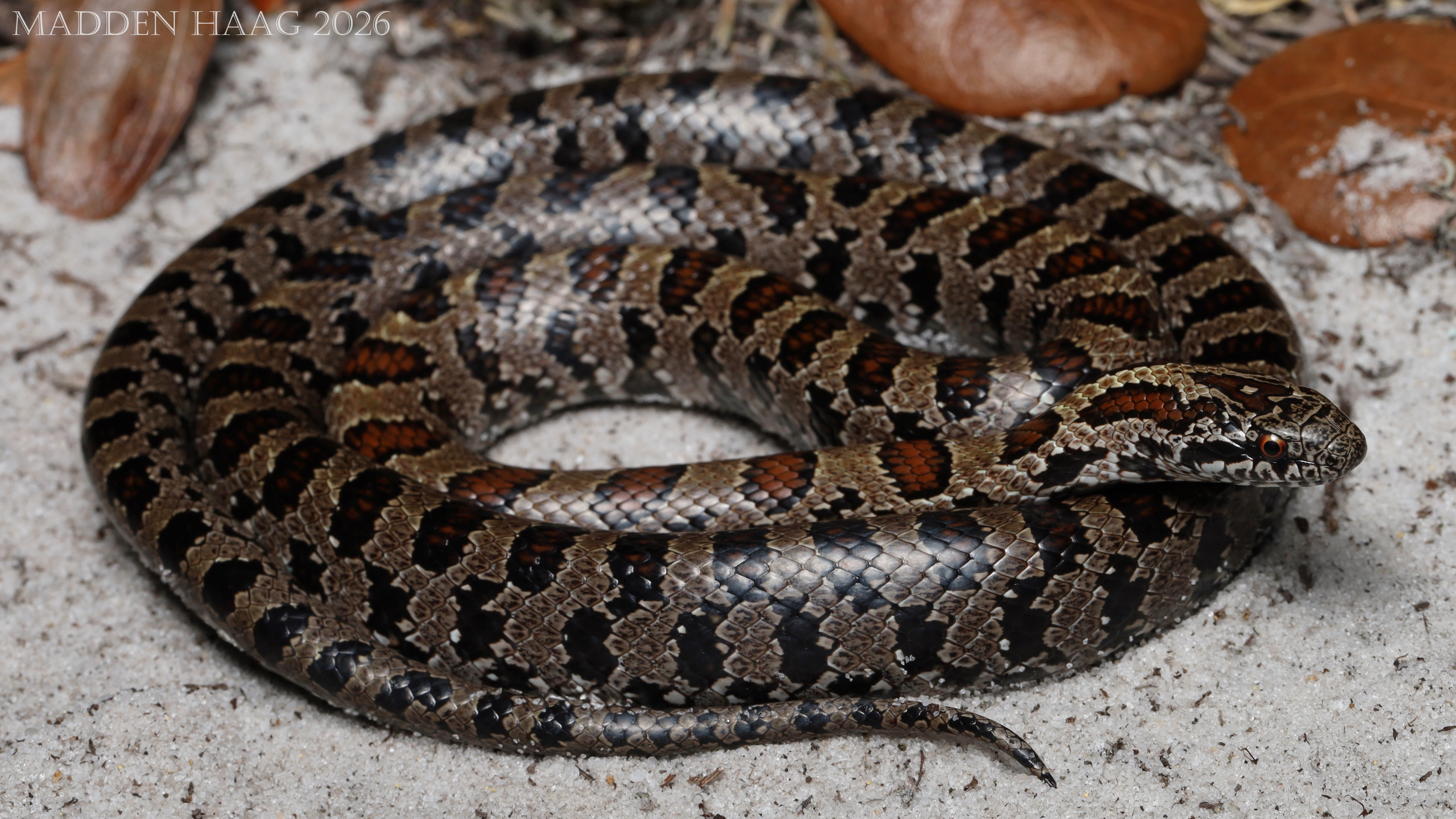

Scientific classification
- Kingdom: Animalia
- Phylum: Chordata
- Class: Reptilia
- Order: Squamata
- Suborder: Serpentes
- Family: Colubridae
- Genus: Lampropeltis
- Species: L. occipitolineata

Binomial name
- Lampropeltis occipitolineata Price, 1987

= Lampropeltis occipitolineata =

Species of snake

Lampropeltis occipitolineata, commonly known as the south Florida mole kingsnake, is a species of nonvenomous snake in the family Colubridae. It is found in Florida in the United States.
