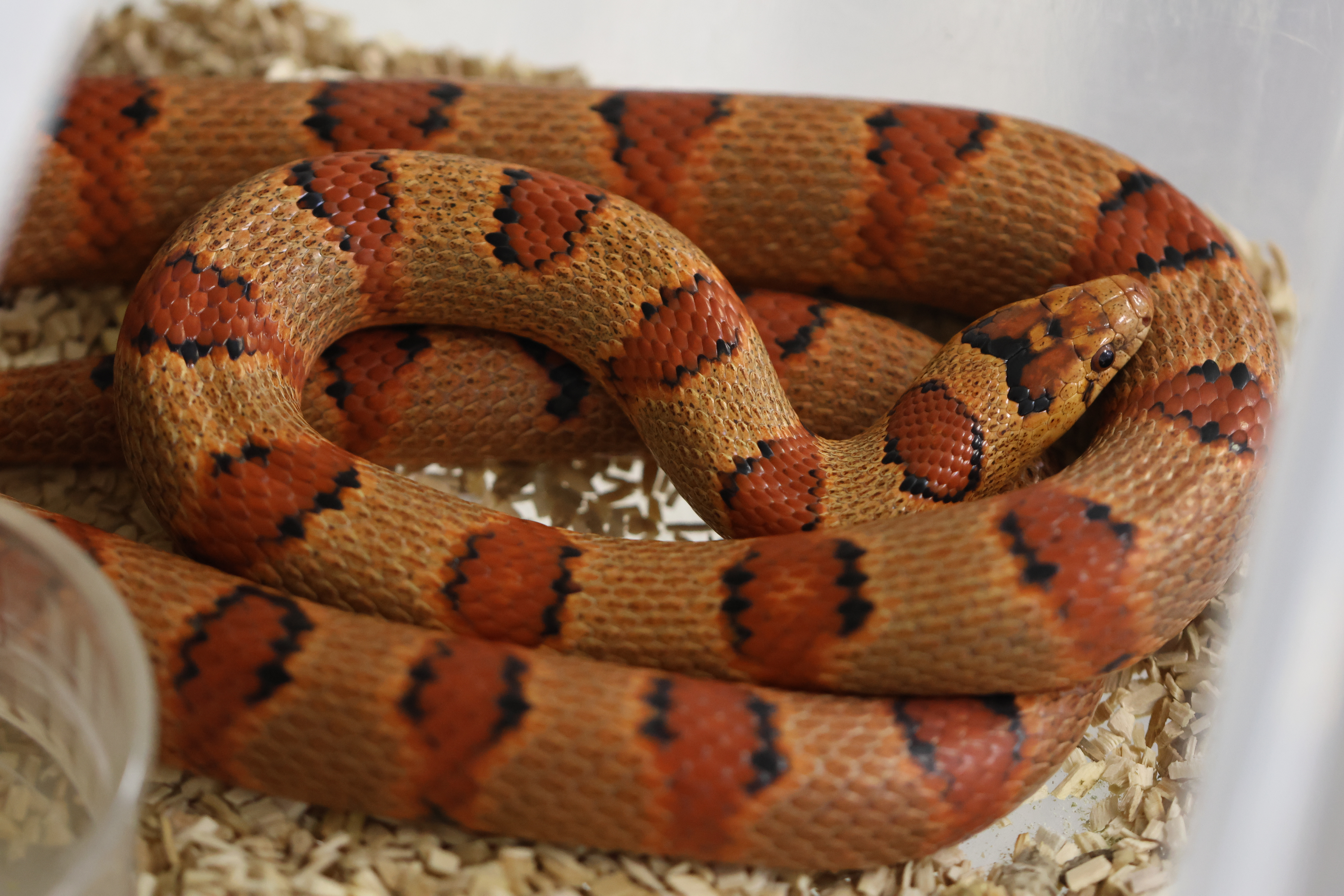

Scientific classification
- Kingdom: Animalia
- Phylum: Chordata
- Class: Reptilia
- Order: Squamata
- Suborder: Serpentes
- Family: Colubridae
- Genus: Lampropeltis
- Species: L. leonis

Binomial name
- Lampropeltis leonis (Günther, 1893)

Synonyms
- Coronella leonis Günther, 1893; Lampropeltis leonis Blanchard, 1920; Lampropeltis thayeri Loveridge, 1924; Lampropeltis mexicana thayeri Gehlbach and Baker, 1962 (in part); Lampropeltis mexicana Garstka, 1982 (in part); Lampropeltis mexicana thayerii Liner and Casas-Andreu, 2008 (unjustified emendation)

= Lampropeltis leonis =

Species of snake

Lampropeltis leonis, known as the Nuevo León kingsnake or variable kingsnake, is a species of colubrid snake endemic to northeastern Mexico.
