= San Antonio Zoo =

- San Antonio Zoo logo

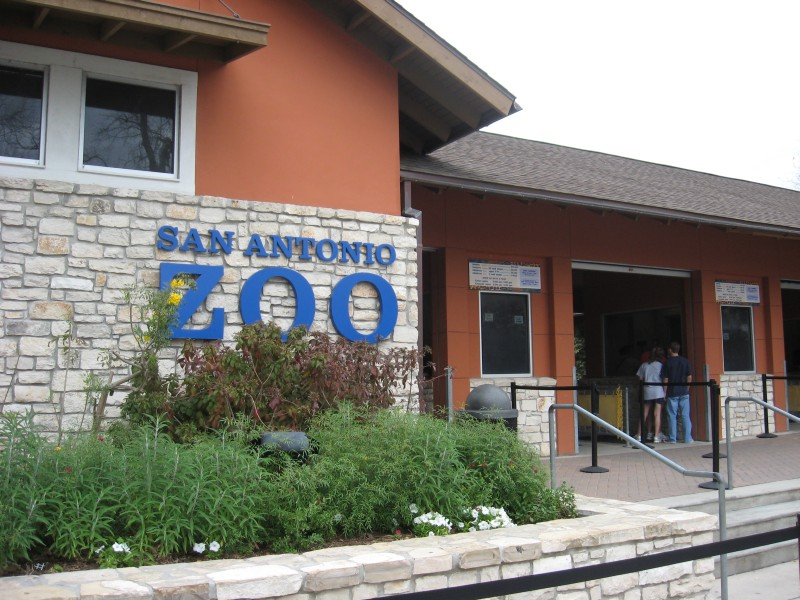
- Zoo entrance
- Interactive map of San Antonio Zoo
- 29.4648°N 98.4719°W
- Date opened: May 3, 1914; 112 years ago
- Location: 3903 N. St. Mary's Street; San Antonio, Texas, United States
- Land area: 57 acres (23 ha)
- No. of animals: 3,500+
- No. of species: 750
- Annual visitors: 1.1 million+
- Memberships: AZA, ZAA
- Public transit: Viva Trolley #11
- Website: sazoo.org

The San Antonio Zoo is a 57-acre (23 ha) zoo located in Brackenridge Park in San Antonio, Texas, United States. It is home to over 750 species, some of which are endangered or extinct in the wild, and has an annual attendance of more than 1 million. The zoo also hosts the Richard Friedrich Aquarium, which opened in 1948. It was the only aquarium in the city until SeaWorld San Antonio opened in 1988. It also runs non-animal attractions, such as the San Antonio Zoo Train, which first opened in 1956.

== Description ==
The San Antonio Zoo spans 57 acres (23 ha) in Brackenridge Park, located in the city's Midtown area. It is accredited through the Association of Zoos and Aquariums (AZA) and the Zoological Association of America (ZAA).

=== Exhibits and other buildings ===
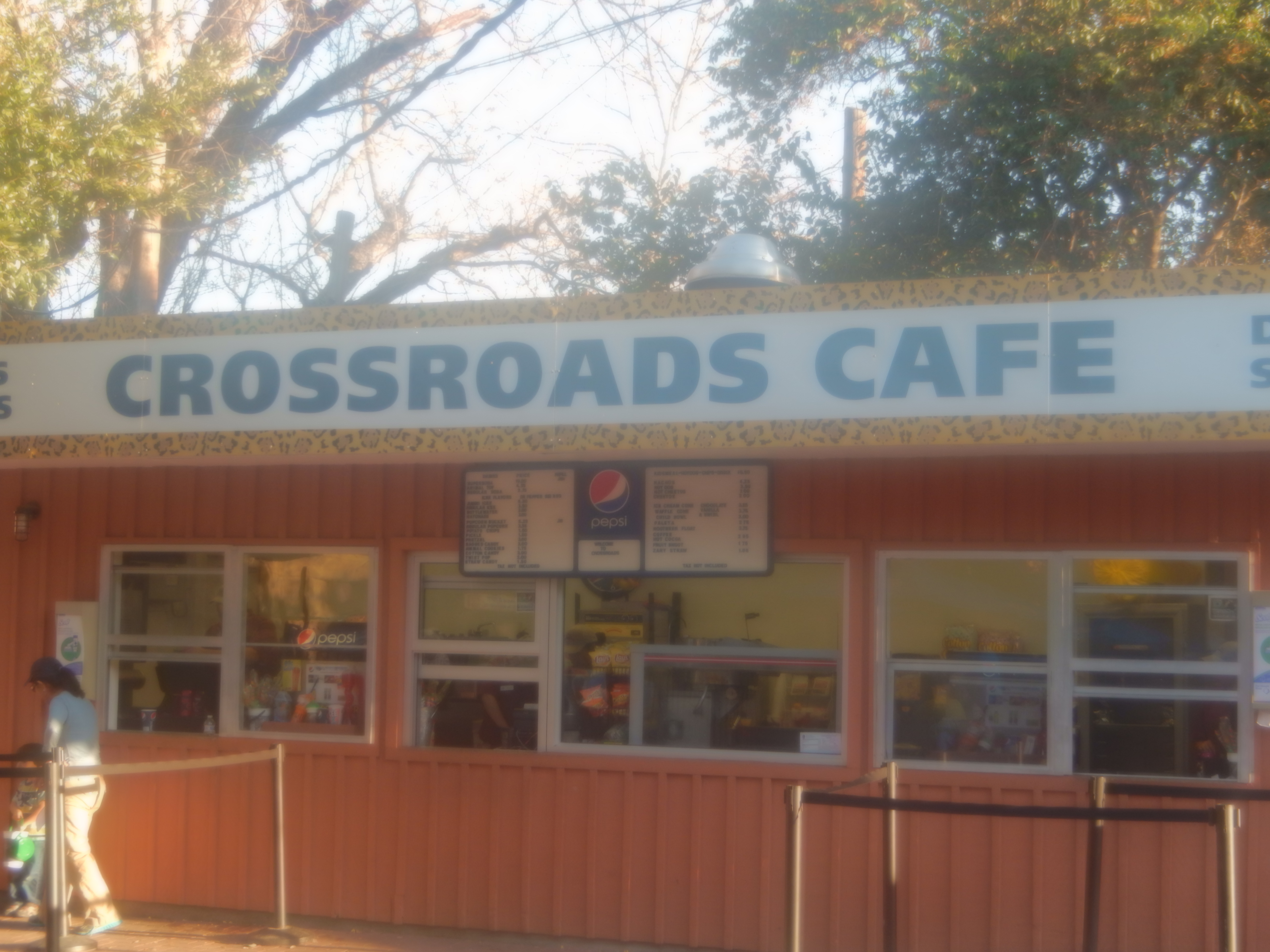
Several refreshment outlets, including Crossroads Café, are available at the San Antonio Zoo.

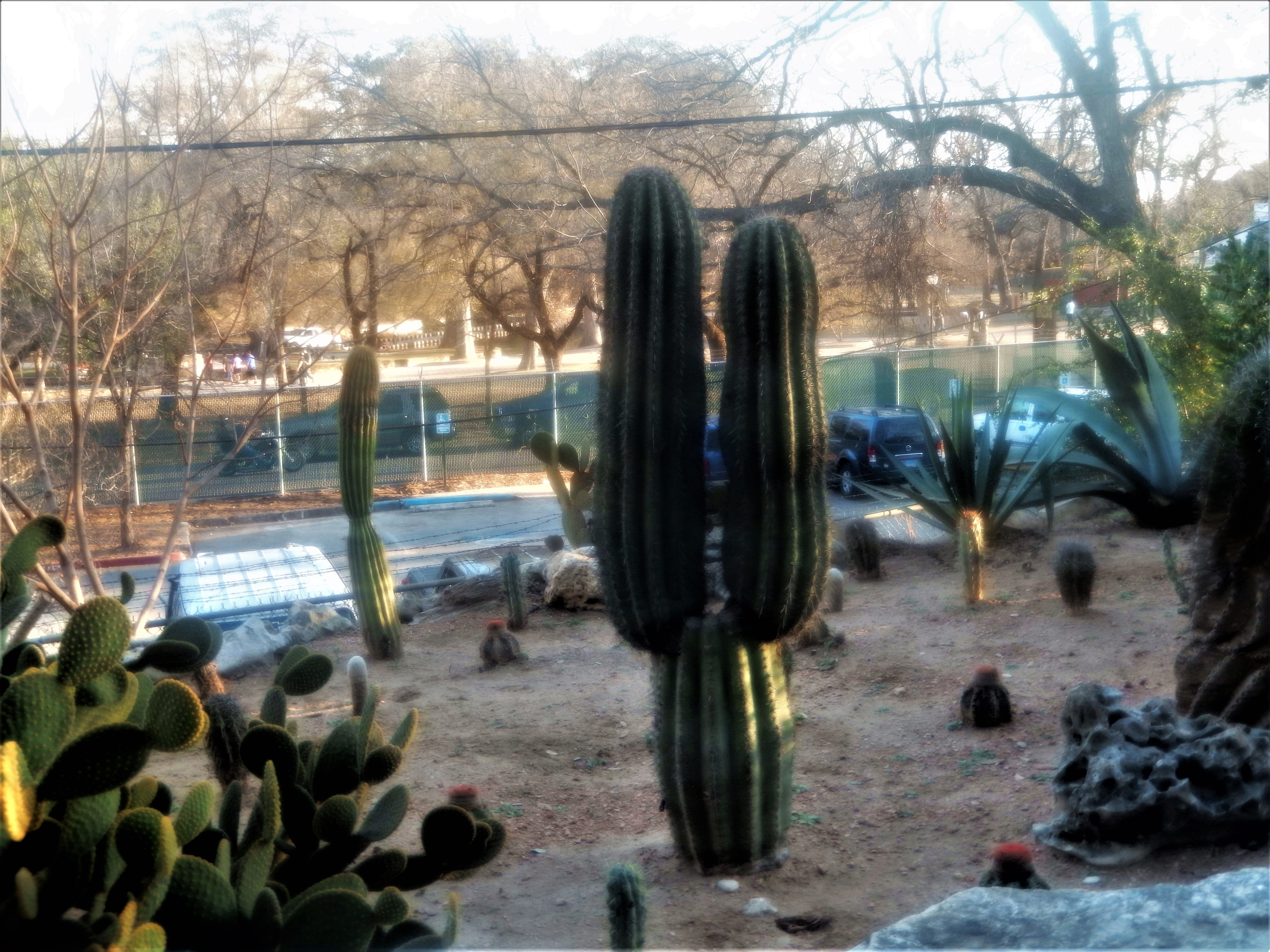
Desert plant and terrain exhibit at the San Antonio Zoo

==== Monkey House and Commissary ====
- Monkey House/Commissary (San Antonio Zoo)
- U.S. National Register of Historic Places
- Coordinates: 29°27′45.9″N 98°28′24.5″W
- Built: 1937
- Architect: Adams & Adams
- Architectural style: Spanish Revival
- MPS: Historic Buildings and Structures of the San Antonio Zoo
- NRHP reference No.: 100010141
- Added to NRHP: April 4, 2024

The Monkey House and Commissary at the San Antonio Zoo was built between 1935 and 1937. It was designed by San Antonio architecture firm Adams & Adams in the Spanish Revival style. Throughout the decades, it has variably served as an animal commissary, veterinary office, staff offices, and the zoo's monkey house. It was listed on the National Register of Historic Places (NRHP) on April 4, 2024, for its architectural value. The building and surrounding plaza were renovated in 2023 ahead of the NRHP nomination, and the structure itself was converted into concessions and restrooms.

=== San Antonio Zoo Train ===
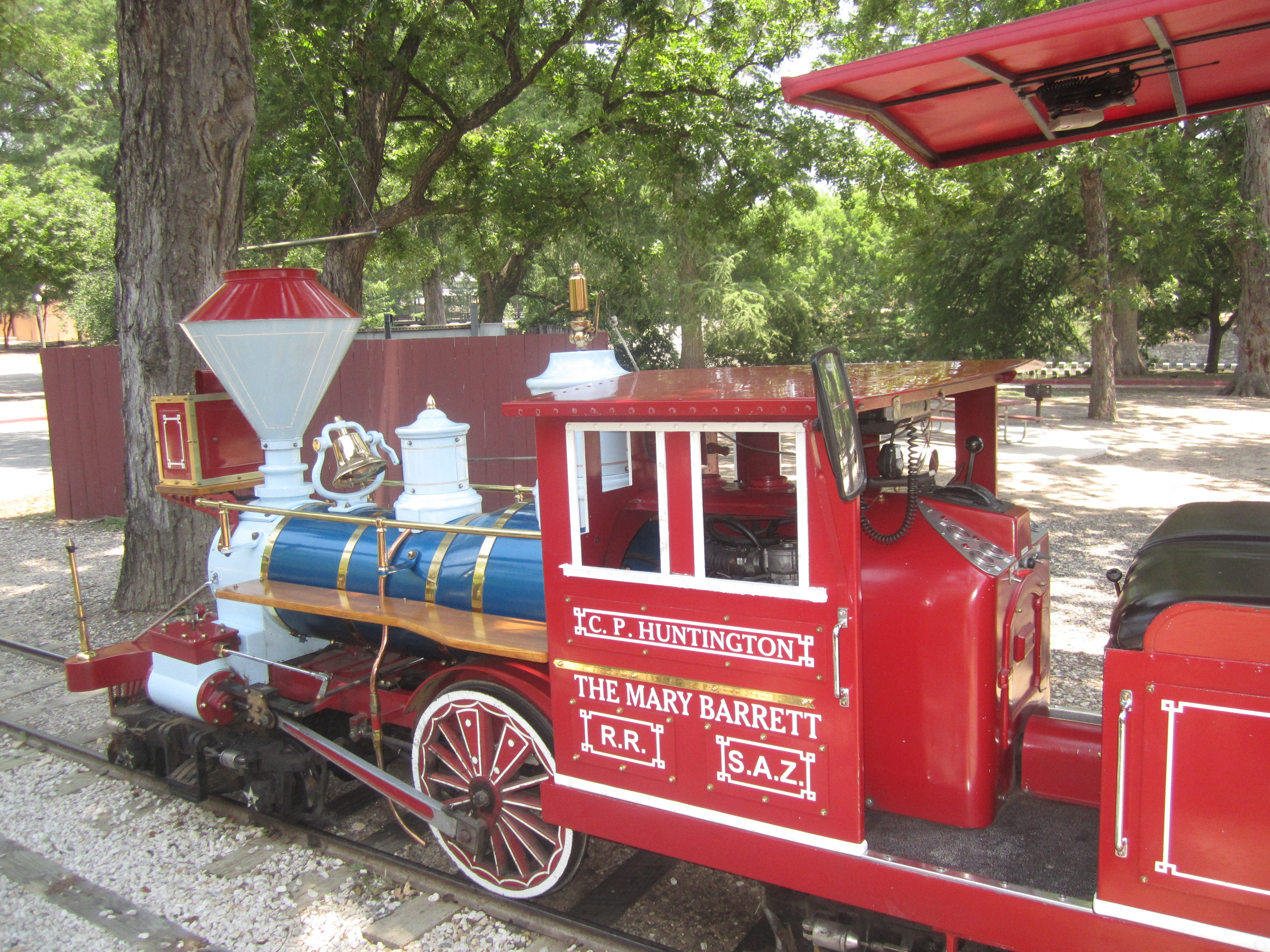
The San Antonio Zoo Train (4-2-4T locomotive pictured, since retired) carries visitors throughout Brackenridge Park.

The San Antonio Zoo Train, formerly the Brackenridge Eagle, is a 2 ft (610 mm) narrow gauge miniature train that connects the zoo to various points of interest within Brackenridge Park. The railway opened in 1956 and had 1 million passengers during its first two years of operation.

== History ==
=== Opening ===
What is now known as the San Antonio Zoo began in 1914 when George Washington Brackenridge, one of the city's leading citizens, placed several animals, including bison, deer, monkeys, African lions, and bears, on land he had deeded to the city. The land became Brackenridge Park and Golf Course.

The San Antonio Zoo opened two of the first cageless exhibits in the United States in November 1929 that offered visitors views of the animals not available in caged exhibits. The Richard Friedrich Aquarium was dedicated in 1948, and the Hixon Bird House, funded through the efforts of Frederick C. Hixon, opened in 1966.

The San Antonio Zoo housed the first herd of addra gazelle in captivity in 1969 and continues to be active in the breeding program for the critically endangered species. Due to the former hoofstock quarantine point in San Antonio, the San Antonio Zoo has historically had a wide variety of hoofstock species.

=== The Great (Little) Train Robbery ===
On July 18, 1970, two bandits held up the Brackenridge Eagle at gunpoint and robbed its passengers. Some passengers initially believed it was a stunt for a charity fundraiser. The robbers fled the scene with $500 ($4,145 in 2025), as well as car keys, checkbooks, and other valuables. Ten days later, two soldiers from Fort Sam Houston, James R. Brown and Paul E. Smith, were apprehended for the crime. Both were discharged from the U.S. Army and later convicted; Smith was sentenced to 20 years and Brown to 10 years. Dubbed "the Great (Little) Train Robbery", this holdup has remained the last train robbery in Texas.

=== 21st century ===
Phase I of Africa Live!, which opened in 2008, brought a new exhibit for hippos with underwater viewing area and one for new Nile crocodiles as well as many other smaller animals. Phase II contains Angolan colobus monkeys, okapi, African hunting dogs, rock hyrax, and various species of birds contained in the second largest aviary in the world. The zoo opened Phase II of Africa Live! in 2010.

On June 18, 2013, a two-headed Texas river cooter turtle hatched. The turtle was named Thelma and Louise after the 1991 film. Thelma and Louise died on July 29, 2014, from unknown causes.

Josh the African lion was permanently transferred to the Birmingham Zoo in April 2022 as part of the AZA's Species Survival Plan.

The zoo began construction of its new gorilla habitat, Congo Falls, in 2023. The zoo's previous gorilla habitat closed with the relocation of its last gorilla to the National Zoo in 1990. The 2-acre (0.81 ha) exhibit officially opened on December 13th, 2025.

In October 2024, San Antonio Zoo opened its expanded African habitat, the Naylor Savanna, which greatly increased exhibit space for African species and included a new giraffe barn. Upon its opening, the new habitat was the largest in the zoo's history. The Spekboom Lodge, situated in the middle of the giraffe habitat, opened as a space for guests to rent a night in the zoo on November 1, 2024.

== Conservation ==
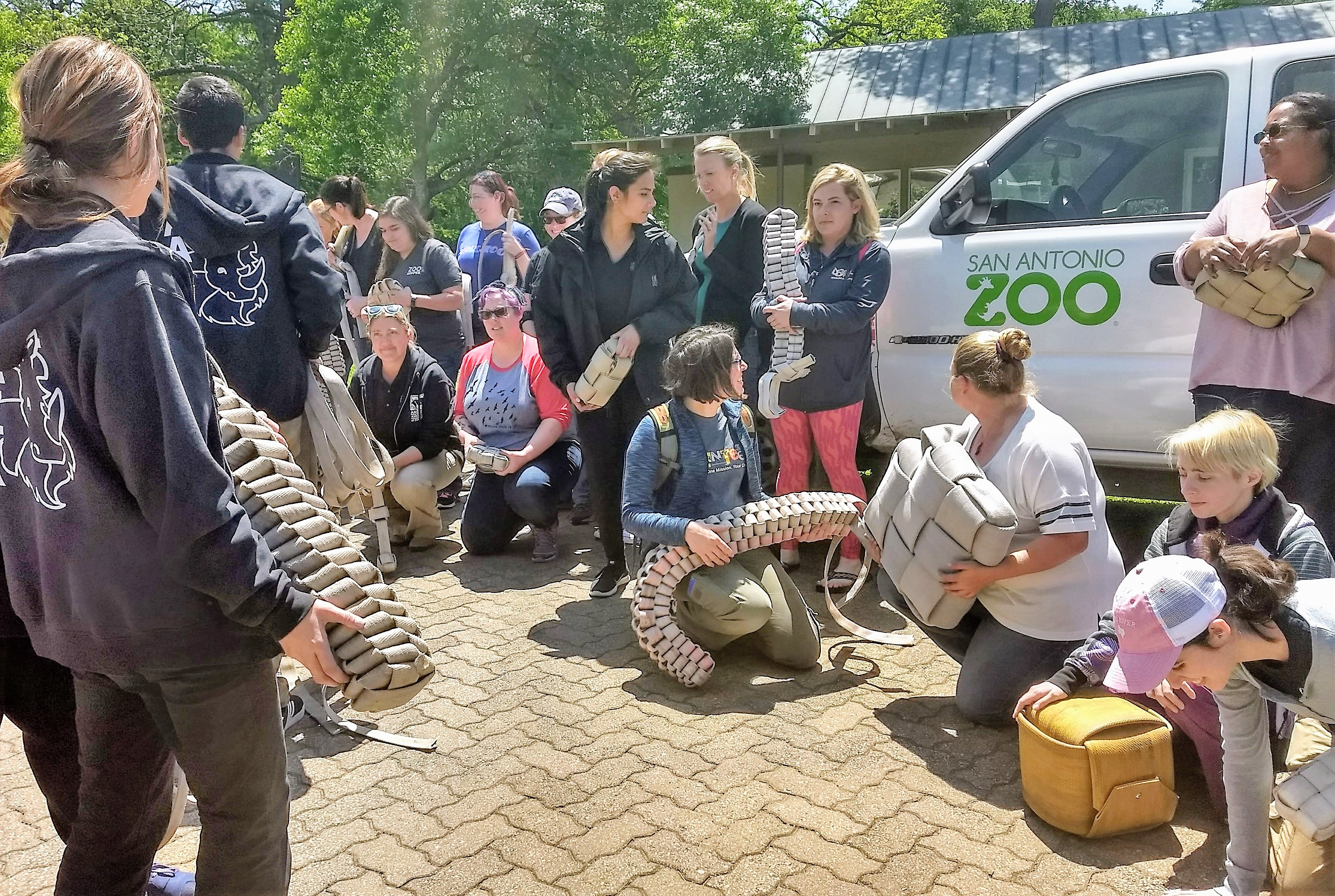
Outreach events allow for staff to share about conservation efforts.

The Center for Conservation and Research at the San Antonio Zoo is involved in breeding a number of endangered species including black rhino, leopard, golden lion tamarin, dama gazelle, Attwater's prairie chicken (housed and bred off-exhibit), black mangabey, African lion, black-footed ferret, Komodo dragon, Andean condor, and Caribbean flamingos.

The zoo is also involved in the conservation of the Texas horned lizard through its Texas Horned Lizard Reintroduction Project, breeding and then releasing the animals back into their native habitat. The project runs in collaboration with several organizations, including the Texas Parks and Wildlife Department and Zoo Miami. As of 2024, the center had released 258 individuals into the wild.

== Incidents ==
In 1992, a zookeeper, Jubal Cox, was tossed by an Asian elephant and received fatal injuries. The zoo launched an investigation into the circumstances surrounding the incident and decided not to euthanize the elephant. Cox's death was the first in the zoo's history. This incident marked the end of elephant rides at the zoo.

== Species ==
The San Antonio Zoo is home to over 3,500 animals belonging to 750 species.

=== Mammals ===
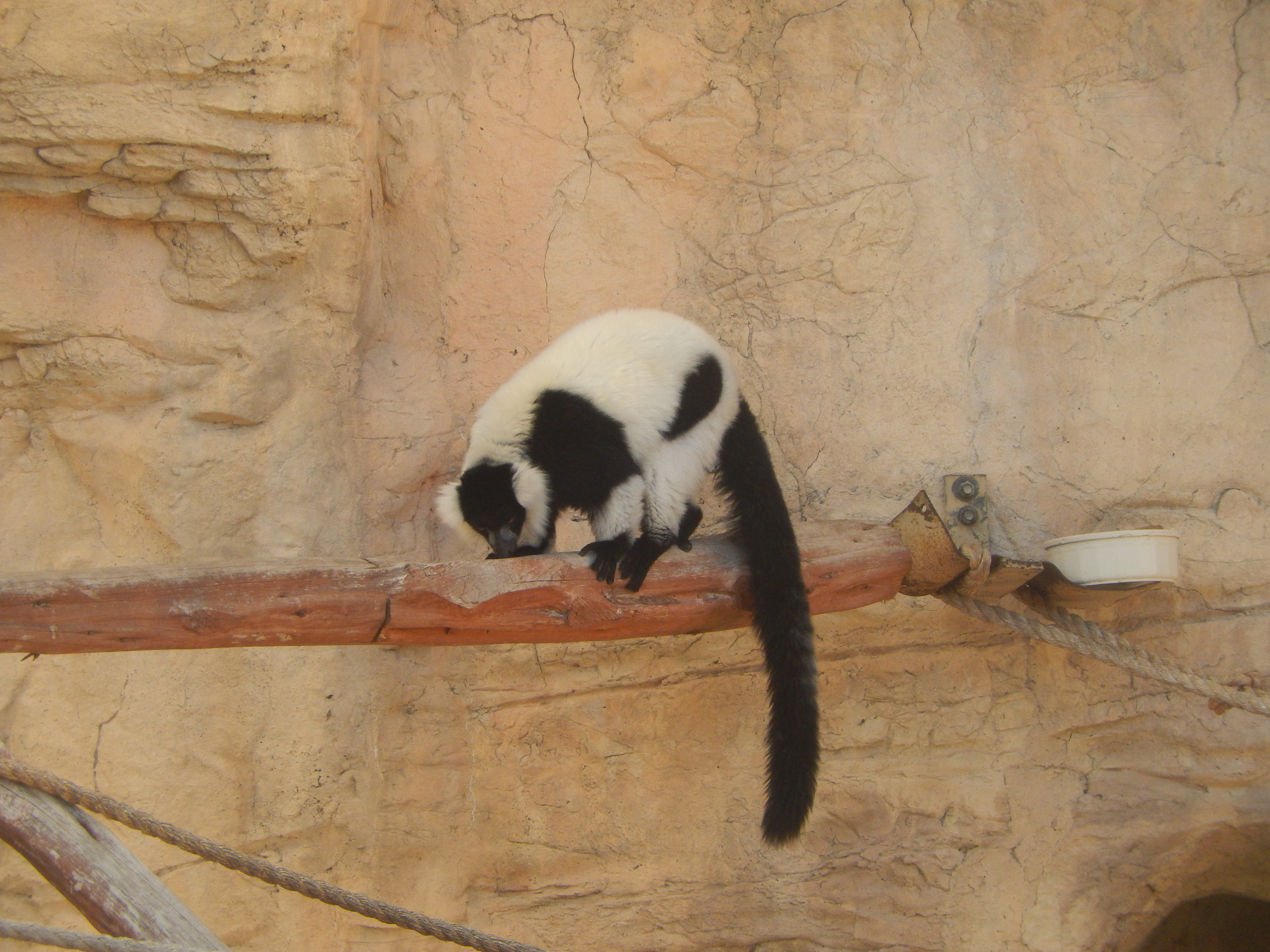
Lemur at the San Antonio Zoo

- Addax
- Addra gazelle
- African lion
- African pygmy goat
- African wild dog
- American black bear
- Angola colobus
- Bactrian Camel
- Bat-eared fox
- Black howler monkey
- Black-and-white ruffed lemur
- Black-footed cat
- Black-tailed prairie dog
- Blue duiker
- Bush dog
- Capybara
- Colombian white-faced capuchin
- Common squirrel monkey
- Common warthog
- Clouded leopard
- Crested porcupine
- Fishing cat
- Fossa
- Francois' langur
- Geoffroy's marmoset
- Giant anteater
- Giraffe
- Golden lion tamarin
- Golden-headed lion tamarin
- Hippopotamus
- Impala
- Indian boar
- Jaguar
- Kinkajou
- Kirk's dik-dik
- Large flying fox
- Linnaeus's two-toed sloth
- Malayan tapir
- Matschie's tree-kangaroo
- Meerkat
- Naked mole-rat
- Nine-banded armadillo
- North American porcupine
- Northern tree shrew
- Ocelot
- Okapi
- Oriental small-clawed otter
- Philippine porcupine
- Plains zebra
- Prevost's squirrel
- Red kangaroo
- Red river hog
- Red ruffed lemur
- Ringtail
- Rock hyrax
- Seba's short-tailed bat
- Sitatunga
- Southern tamandua
- Southern white rhinoceros
- Spectacled bear
- Spotted hyena
- Striped skunk
- Sumatran tiger
- Virginia opossum
- Vietnamese pot-bellied pig
- Western lowland gorilla
- Western grey kangaroo
- White-cheeked gibbon
- Waterbuck
- White-faced saki
- Wolf's guenon
- Yellow-backed duiker
- Yellow-footed rock-wallaby

=== Birds ===
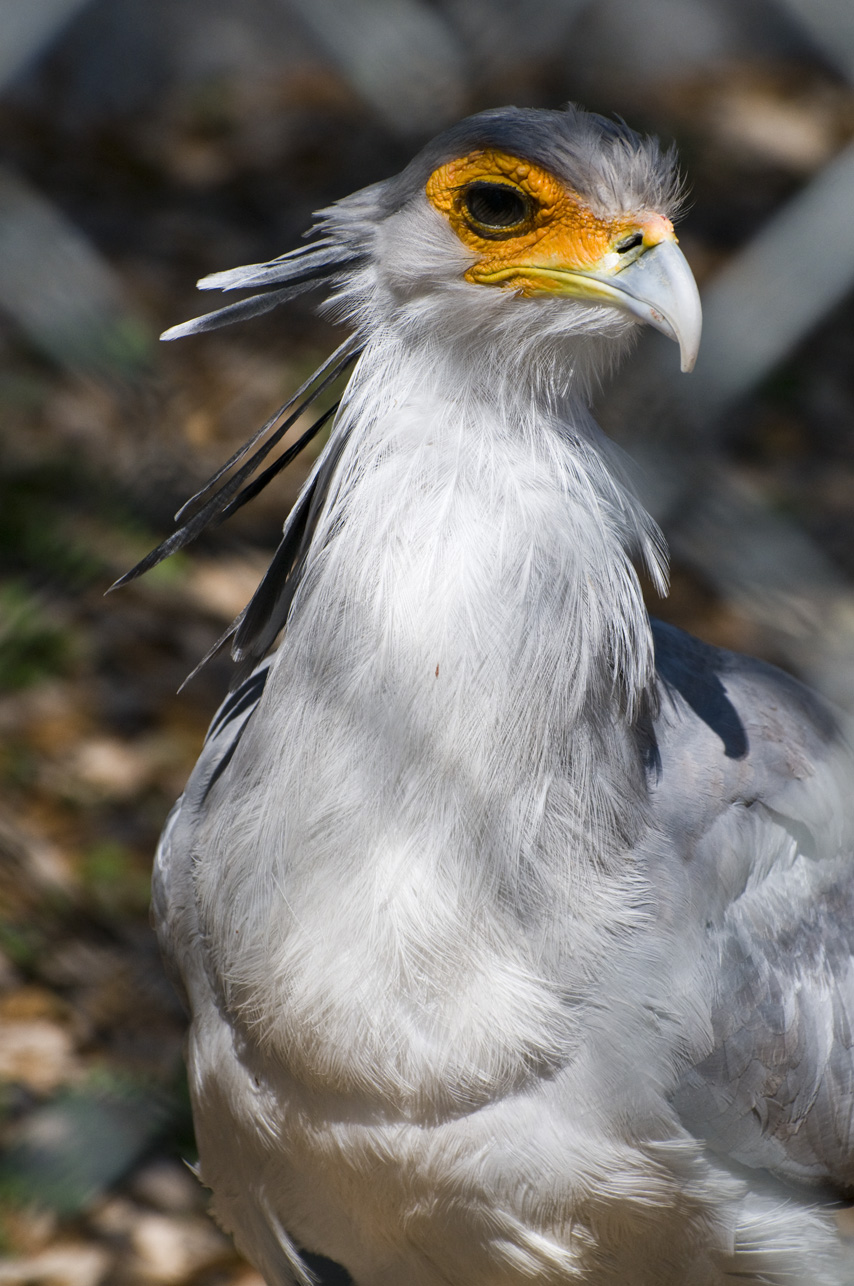
Secretarybird at the San Antonio Zoo

- Abdim's stork
- American flamingo
- American white pelican
- Andean tinamou
- Australian wood duck
- Bali myna
- Bar-headed goose
- Black-and-white mannikin
- Black swan
- Black-necked aracari
- Black-necked swan
- Blue-billed teal
- Blue-bellied roller
- Blue-grey tanager
- Boat-billed heron
- Bruce's green pigeon
- Buff-crested bustard
- Chilean flamingo
- Chiloe wigeon
- Common goldeneye
- Congo peafowl
- Crested pigeon
- Crested screamer
- Crested wood partridge
- Crowned hornbill
- Curl-crested aracari
- Demoiselle crane
- Diamond dove
- Double-wattled cassowary
- Eastern screech owl
- Emerald starling
- Emu
- Fulvous whistling duck
- Germain's peacock-pheasant
- Golden-breasted starling
- Great blue turaco
- Greater flamingo
- Greater vasa parrot
- Green aracari
- Green oropendola
- Green-winged macaw
- Green-winged dove
- Grey-winged trumpeter
- Grey crowned crane
- Guam kingfisher
- Guianan toucanet
- Guira cuckoo
- Hadada ibis
- Hammerkop
- Hooded crane
- Hooded merganser
- Inca tern
- Lady Ross's turaco
- Laughing gull
- Laysan teal
- Madagascar teal
- Magpie goose
- Magpie shrike
- Malayan peacock pheasant
- Marabou stork
- Marbled teal
- Masked lapwing
- Metallic starling
- Mindanao bleeding-heart
- Military macaw
- Namaqua dove
- Nicobar pigeon
- Northern pintail
- Ostrich
- Palm cockatoo
- Peruvian thick-knee
- Pied crow
- Pied imperial pigeon
- Purplish jay
- Radjah shelduck
- Raggiana bird-of-paradise
- Rainbow lorikeet
- Red-and-yellow barbet
- Red-capped cardinal
- Red-crested finch
- Redhead duck
- Red-legged honeycreeper
- Red-legged seriema
- Ringed teal
- Rose-ringed parakeet
- Ruddy duck
- Sandhill crane
- Scarlet ibis
- Secretarybird
- Snowy-crowned robin-chat
- Speckled mousebird
- Speckled pigeon
- Straw-necked ibis
- Sulawesi ground dove
- Sunbittern
- Sun conure
- Superb starling
- Swan goose
- Taveta golden weaver
- Tawny frogmouth
- Victoria crowned pigeon
- Violet-backed starling
- Wattled crane
- West African crowned crane
- Western crowned pigeon
- White stork
- White-headed buffalo weaver
- Whooping crane
- Wreathed hornbill
- Yellow-breasted ground dove
- Zebra dove

=== Reptiles ===
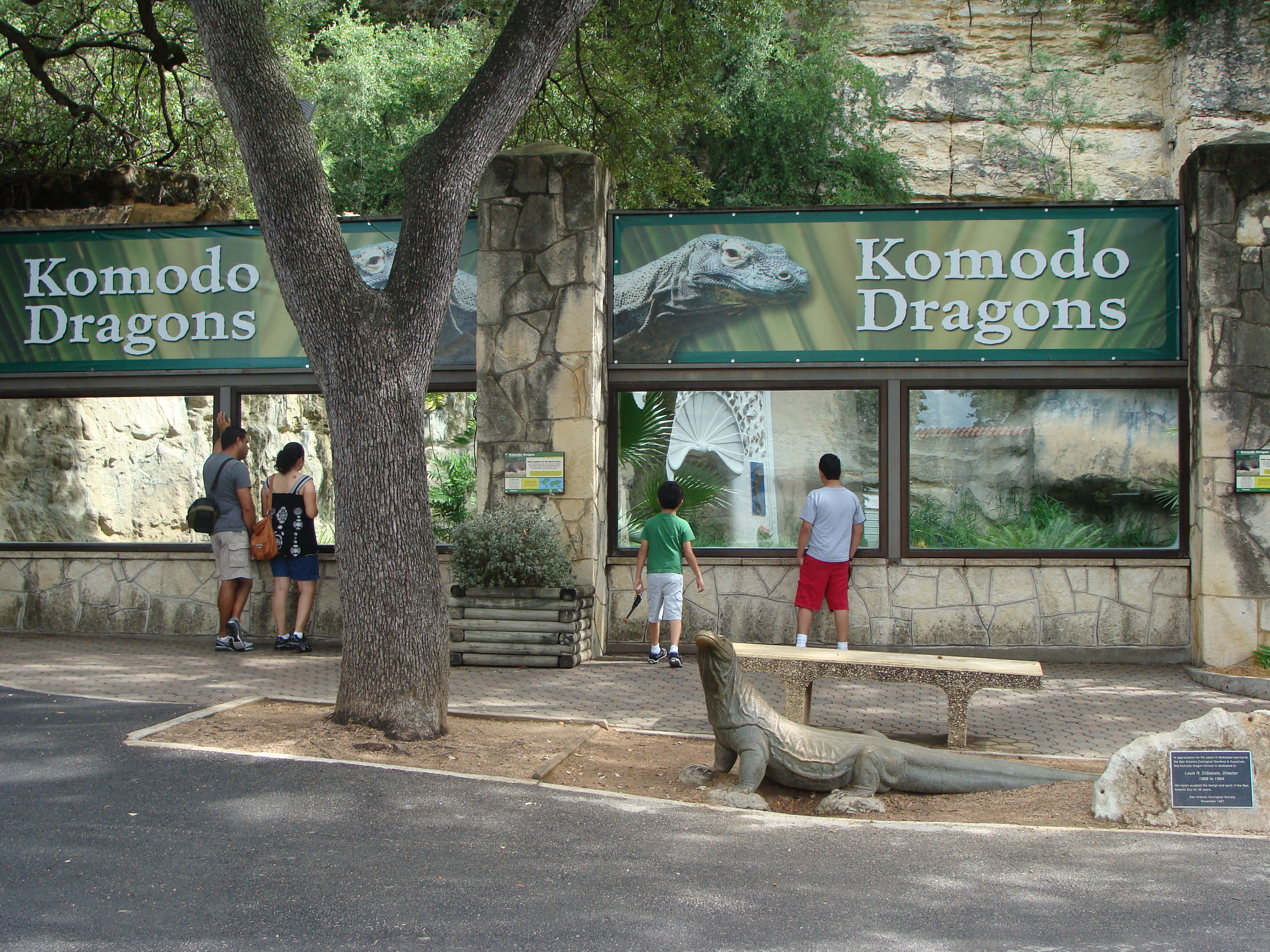
Komodo dragon exhibit

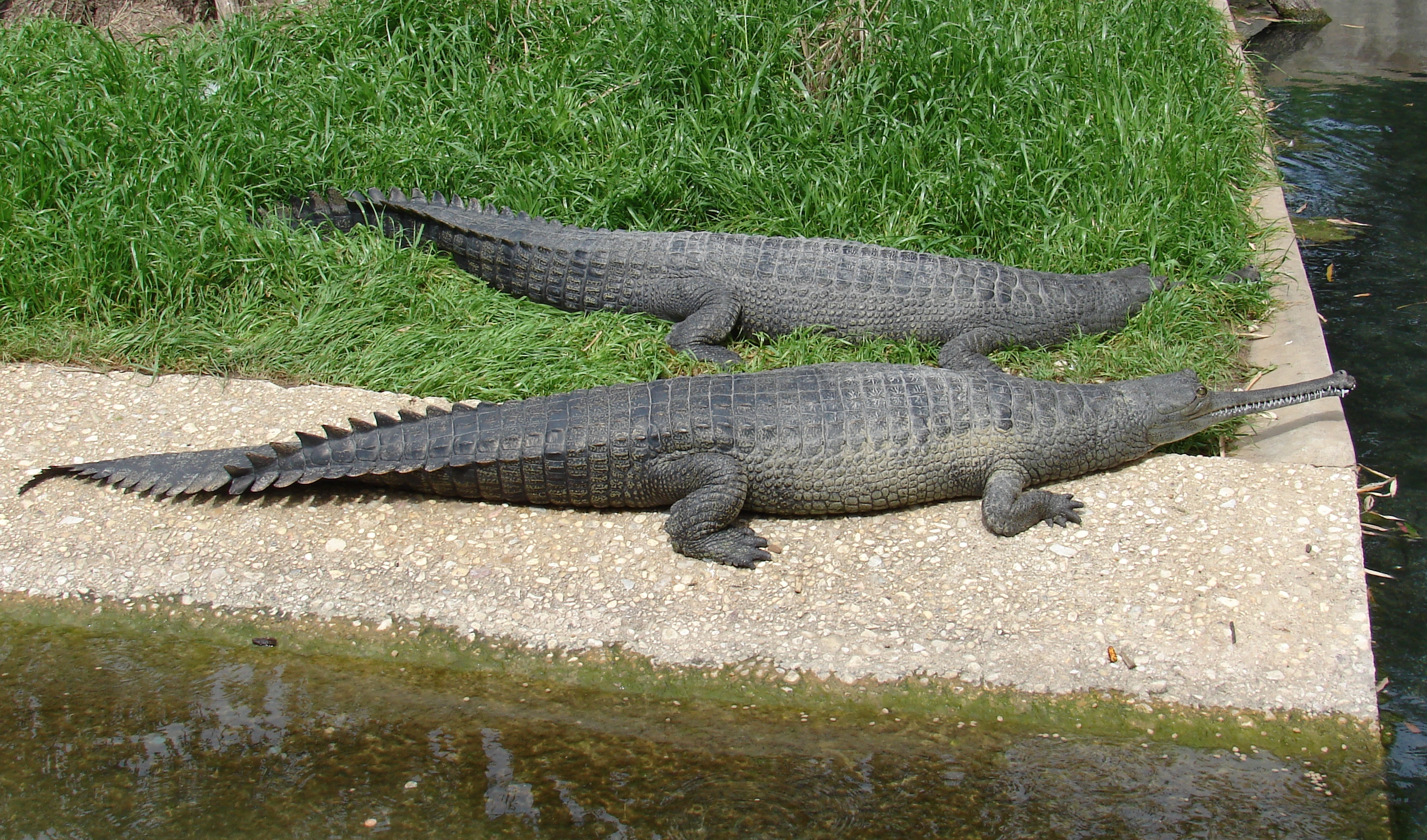
Gharials at the San Antonio Zoo

- African mud turtle
- African rock python
- Aldabra giant tortoise
- Amazon tree boa
- American alligator
- Armstrong’s dusky rattlesnake
- Aruba island rattlesnake
- Ball python
- Banded alligator lizard
- Banded rock rattlesnake
- Black milk snake
- Black wood turtle
- Broad-banded copperhead
- Bushmaster
- Bull snake
- Caatinga lancehead
- Cagle's map turtle
- California kingsnake
- Cape Cobra
- Chinese crocodile lizard
- Coahuilan box turtle
- Corn snake
- Cross-banded rattlesnake
- Cuban false chameleon
- Cuvier's dwarf caiman
- Dunn's hognose viper
- Durango mountain kingsnake
- Dwarf crocodile
- Eastern box turtle
- Emerald alligator lizard
- Ethiopian mountain adder
- Eyelash palm-pitviper
- Fly River turtle
- Gaboon Viper
- Gharial
- Green tree python
- Grey-banded kingsnake
- Guatemalan palm viper
- Hamilton’s pond turtle
- Humantlan rattlesnake
- Indian flapshell turtle
- Jamaican boa
- King cobra
- Komodo dragon
- Mang Mountain viper
- Mexican alligator lizard
- Mexican beaded lizard
- Mexican lance-headed rattlesnake
- Mexican milksnake
- Mexican mud turtle
- Mexican pygmy rattlesnake
- New Mexico ridge-nosed rattlesnake
- Nile crocodile
- Okinawa habu
- Red spitting cobra
- Red-eared slider
- Reticulated python
- Rhinoceros ratsnake
- Rhinoceros viper
- Rowley's palm-pitviper
- San Luis Potosi kingsnake
- Sheltopusik
- Spider tortoise
- Southern lined pine snake
- Southern alligator lizard
- Speckled palm pitviper
- Spiny-tailed monitor
- Standing's day gecko
- Tamaulipan flat rock lizard
- Tamaulipan rock rattlesnake
- Taylor’s cantil
- Texas river cooter
- Tomistoma
- Trans-Pecos ratsnake
- Veiled chameleon
- West African green mamba
- Western cottonmouth
- Western diamondback rattlesnake
- Western hognose snake
- Western painted turtle
- Yellow sided twist-necked turtle
- Yellow-spotted Amazon river turtle

=== Amphibians ===
- African bullfrog
- American bullfrog
- Axolotl
- Black-spotted newt
- Dyeing dart frog
- Emperor newt
- European fire salamander
- Giant marine toad
- Golden frog
- Golden mantella
- Green toad
- Australian green tree frog
- Green-and-black poison arrow frog
- Gulf Coast toad
- Japanese giant salamander
- Mexican burrowing frog
- Mexican dumpy frog
- Puerto Rican crested toad
- Red-eyed tree frog
- Red-spotted toad
- Rio Grande leopard frog
- Rio Grande siren
- Sierra Madre salamander
- Couch's spadefoot toad
- Texas toad
- Tiger salamander
- Vietnamese mossy frog
- White's tree frog
- Yellow-banded poison arrow frog
- Yellow-striped caecilian

== See also ==
- List of zoos in the United States
