= Birmingham Zoo =

Zoo in Birmingham, Alabama, United States

- Interactive map of Birmingham Zoo
- 33°29′14.65″N 86°46′46.52″W
- Date opened: April 2, 1955; 71 years ago
- Location: Birmingham, Alabama, United States
- Land area: 122 acres (49 ha)
- No. of animals: 900+
- No. of species: 195+
- Annual visitors: 644,667
- Memberships: AZA, AAZK
- Website: www.birminghamzoo.com

The Birmingham Zoo is a zoological park that opened in 1955 in Birmingham, Alabama, United States.

The Birmingham Zoo is an independent, not for profit, 501(c)(3) organization, and is accredited by the Association of Zoos and Aquariums (AZA), participating in AZA Species Survival Plans (SSP). It is the only AZA accredited zoo in the state of Alabama.

Over 550 animals of 180 species call the Birmingham Zoo home, including giraffes, ostriches, zebras, rhinos, elephants, and other endangered species from six continents.

== History ==
Early history

The Birmingham Zoo originated with a small menagerie of exotic animals kept in a Southside firehouse. As the collection grew, it was moved first to Magnolia Park (now Brother Bryan Park) and then to Avondale Park. At the time, the collection consisted mainly of non-exotic animals, except for "Miss Fancy," a lone elephant donated by the Birmingham Advertising Club which had purchased it as a promotional novelty from a struggling circus stranded in the city.

As the collection grew in size and scope, city leaders contacted the Olmsted Brothers landscape architecture firm, which had drawn up plans for a system of parks in Birmingham, for advice about housing a zoological collection. They were put in contact with the few municipal zoos existing in that period and plans began for providing a new permanent home for the growing attraction.

Lane Park

Birmingham, under mayor A. O. Lane, had purchased land on the south of Red Mountain between 1889 and 1896. The former Red Mountain Cemetery, a pauper's cemetery was part of the parcel that was dedicated as a city park in 1934. The Works Progress Administration built a fish hatchery and a number of pavilions from the Hartselle sandstone quarried out of the mountain within the park's borders. The hatchery was fed by a natural spring and provided stock for recreational lakes in the region until the zoo took over the park.

The first source of post-World War II support for a new zoo came from the Birmingham Junior Chamber of Commerce. In 1946, Elton B. Stephens chaired a Jaycees committee to create a new zoo for the city of Birmingham. In 1949, then Birmingham mayor, James R. Morgan, a key supporter of the development, began an initiative to help in the planning and development of a city zoo.

Jimmy Morgan Zoo

A zoo commission was also established, and it decided to build the zoo on 50 acres (20 ha) of land on the southern foot of Red Mountain with a budget of $250,000. A much larger parcel of land that included the zoo parcel was incorporated into the city of Birmingham and was named Lane Park, home of the zoo as well as the neighboring botanical gardens.

The budget would be spent to build six exhibits with the opening of the zoo that included "Monkey Island," an elephant house, bear moat, birdhouse, snake pit and seal pool. The funds were raised through private donations, charter memberships, and in-kind donations from a broad base of community and business supporters.

The zoo, once known as the Jimmy Morgan Zoo, opened its doors with Monkey Island as its first official exhibit on April 2, 1955. The Jimmy Morgan Zoo operated as a quasi-private venture until city of Birmingham decided to assume responsibility in November 1955. In 1960, Bob Truett, a zoologist at the Lincoln Park Zoo in Chicago was hired as the first real zoo director. Truett petitioned the city and changed the name to the Birmingham Zoo. The city set an annual budget of $663,000 for its first year under city control.

By the early 1960s, the Alabama Zoological Society was created as a non-profit support group to raise funds to supplement the escalating operational necessities, since funding for the zoo was inadequate to maintain and operate it at acceptable professional standards. A series of master plans were developed but never came to fruition due to lack of funding throughout the 1970s and 1980s. The need for significant improvements became increasingly evident by the 1990s.

Truett was instrumental in starting the Zoological Society, creating the master plan and beginning the implementation of the plan. He was zoo director for 30 years before retiring in 1991. During his tenure, the zoo went from a few exhibits centered around a monkey island to a full-fledged, fully accredited, world class zoo.

The numerous financial demands on the city taking precedence led to the zoo's loss of accreditation by the Association of Zoos and Aquariums in the late 1990s due to concern about aging facilities and uncertainty over continued funding.

In 1999, members of the Alabama Zoological Society worked with Birmingham mayor Richard Arrington Jr. and other political leaders to set up a public-private partnership to operate the zoo. Strong community leaders were recruited to serve as the first board of directors of a new organization, Birmingham Zoo, Inc. (BZI). The new organization established a transitional funding package with contributions from four government entities to support BZI during its first five years of operation.

21st century

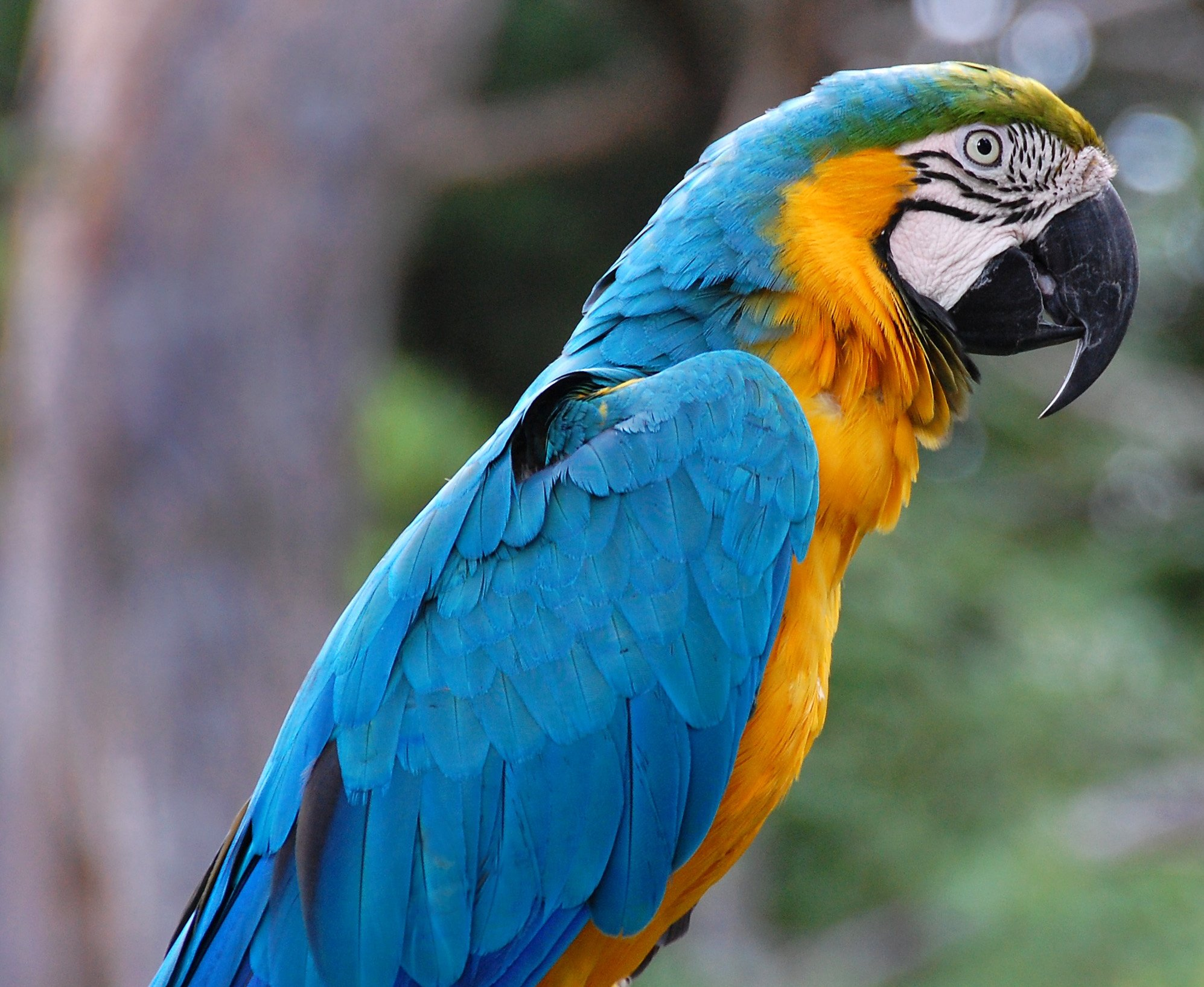
Blue-and-yellow macaw (Ara ararauna) at the zoo

BZI undertook an intense 18-month effort to address the most pressing and immediate problems so that the zoo could become accredited by the AZA once again, ranking the zoo in the top 10% of animal holding facilities in the nation. The zoo also received 501 (c)(3) status from the IRS, and the first major capital campaign was launched in January 2001.

William R. Foster, DVM, joined the zoo as chief executive officer in January 2004. Foster, a veterinarian and leading zoo management authority on the national scene, is the past president of the American Zoo and Aquarium Association and was president and executive director of the Louisville Zoo. Chris Pfefferkorn, with over 25 years of Zoological experience, took over as President & CEO on July 1, 2018.

Since privatization, the Birmingham Zoo has hosted traveling exhibits of bats, koalas, and black-footed penguins, added a permanent Komodo dragon exhibit and interactive lorikeet aviary, and regained AZA accreditation. The zoo completed the Junior League of Birmingham – Hugh Kaul Children's Zoo, a $15 million anchor exhibit dedicated to children and devoted to urban, rural, and wild animals and environs of Alabama in April 2005, its 50th anniversary of operation.

In 2004, the zoo's older western lowland gorilla, Babec, became the first gorilla to be implanted with a pacemaker due to advanced heart disease.

In 2011, the zoo opened its new Trails of Africa exhibit with the goal of housing an all-male herd of African elephants and becoming a national leader in the care and breeding of elephants. It included Bulwagi of Disney's Animal Kingdom, Callee of the Pittsburgh Zoo, and Ajani of the Indianapolis Zoo. A fourth bull elephant named Tamani arrived from Tampa's Lowry Park Zoo in April 2012 to complete the herd. The Kiwanis Giraffe Encounter was opened to the public at that same time. Four months later, the two male African lions, Baron and Vulcan were sent to the Montgomery Zoo for a recommendation of the Association of Zoos and Aquariums' Species Survival Plan. In late October 2012, a southern white rhinoceros named Max arrived from the Brevard Zoo to take part in a breeding program with the zoo's two female southern white rhinos, Laptop and her daughter, Ajabu. The zoo was also home to a male Nile hippopotamus named Tadpole until his passing in June 2020.

It opened a temporary exhibit with fifteen animatronic dinosaurs known as "Dino Discovery". They were on display from March 16 to September 2, 2013.

In March 2014, two female American black bear cubs were added to the zoo. They were sent from Big Sky, Montana. The zoo introduced an exhibit featuring these two black bears known as the Barbara Ingalls Shook Black Bear Trail a year later.

In late February 2015, Cenzoo, the western lowland gorilla, was transferred to Riverbanks Zoo to breed with three female gorillas. The African elephant, Tamani, was sent to Missouri's Kansas City Zoo to breed with six female elephants eight months later.

In March 2017, the zoo introduced a three-year-old male jaguar named Khan. He was sent from the Jacksonville Zoo and Gardens.

The African elephant, Ajani was sent to Wichita's Sedgwick County Zoo to breed with six female elephants in May 2018. A year later, Callee the African elephant was transferred to Omaha, Nebraska's Henry Doorly Zoo and Aquarium to breed with its five female elephants. Bulwagi remained the zoo's only African elephant until two young male African elephants named Ingadze and Lutsandvo arrived from San Diego Zoo Safari Park. Following Kwanzaa the lion's death, a young adult male lion named Josh arrived from the San Antonio Zoo in April 2022. In June 2022, a five-year-old eastern black rhinoceros named Moyo successfully arrived from the Saint Louis Zoo. Around that same time in summer of 2022, a five-year-old female eastern black rhinoceros named Kesi arrived from the Pittsburgh Zoo & Aquarium to be Moyo's potential mate. Unfortunately, Moyo suffered a severe dental procedure on January 26, 2024. The zookeepers euthanized him afterwards. This zoo opened its North American cougar and bobcat habitats in its Alabama Wilds section on March 19, 2025. Khan the jaguar transferred to Brevard Zoo where he would repopulate with a mate in order to prevent the extinction of his species four months later.

== Exhibits ==
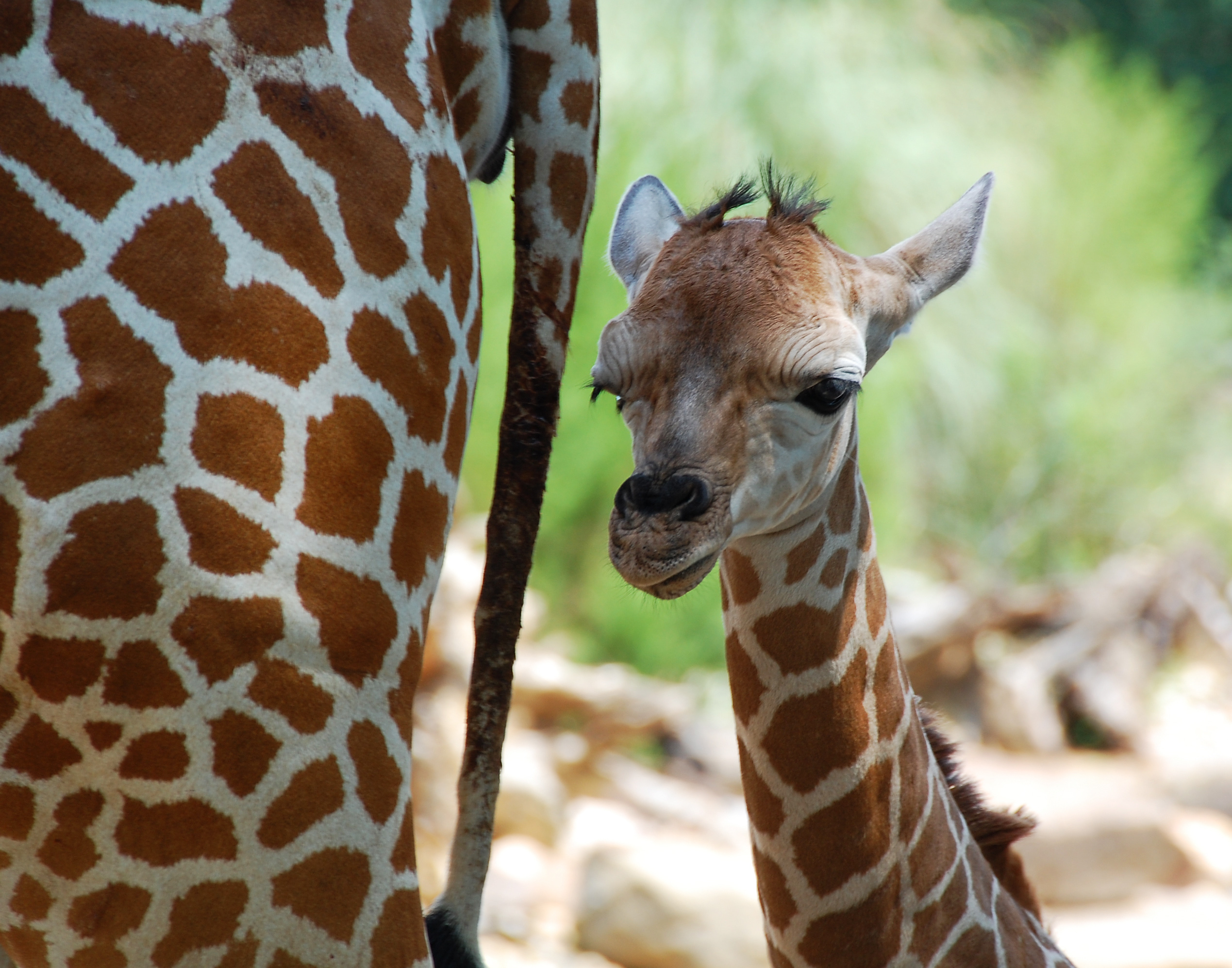
Baby giraffe, Willow, with mother, Juno, in July 2008

Main Zoo

- Sea Lions: California Sea Lions
- Southern Bayou: American alligators
- Flamingo Lagoon: black-necked swans, American flamingos
- Lorikeet Interactive Feeding and Observation Aviary (only open spring and summer): Rainbow lorikeets and coconut lorikeets.
- Predator Building: African lions, Black-footed cats, Coyotes, Fennec foxs, Pallas’s cats,Prevost's squirrels, Red pandas, Sand cats
- Primate Building (South America): black howler monkeys, jaguars, giant anteaters, giant otters, Sumatran orangutans
- Reptile Building: snakes
- Wildlife Stage

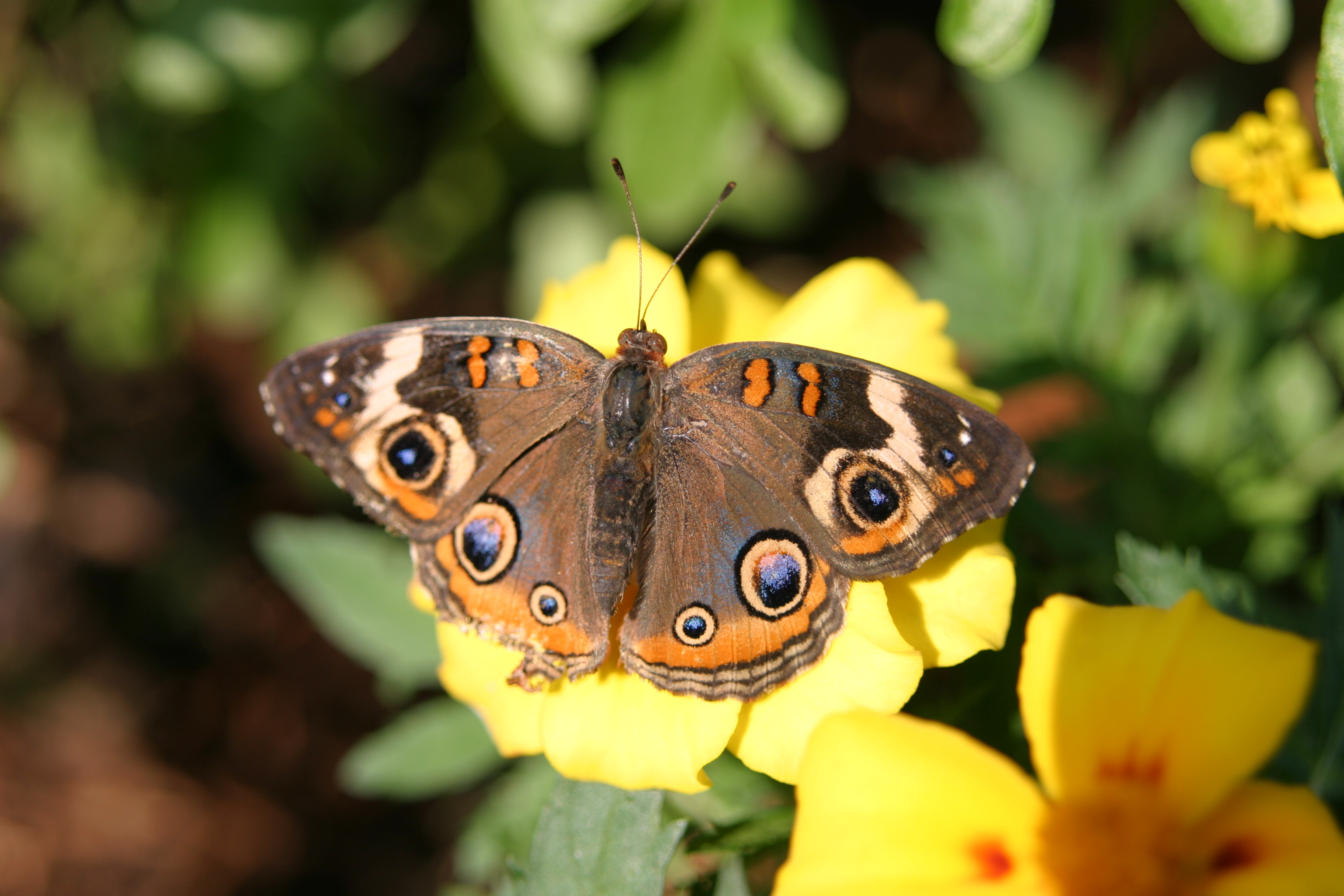
Buckeye butterfly at the Birmingham Zoo Butterfly House

Junior League of Birmingham-Hugh Kaul Children's Zoo

- Alabama Barn: goats
- Alabama Wilds: fish, sandhill cranes, North American river otters, wild turkeys
- Barbara Ingalls Shook Black Bear Trail: American black bears
- The Corral:
- Grandma's Back Porch
- Granny's Butterfly House (Memorial Day through Labor Day)
- Granny's Goose Patch

Trails of Africa

Trails of Africa logo

In 2007, the zoo announced a major expansion called Trails of Africa. Opened in 2011, this exhibit features bull African elephants in a bachelor herd setting. The exhibit is revolutionary; a US zoo had never before housed multiple males together and attempted to replicate these bull herds recently discovered in the wild. At this time, three elephants (Bulwagi, Ingadze, and Lutsandvo) reside in the new facility. Trails of Africa includes an interactive boma yard, safari cafe, waterhole exhibit, and many more small accessories. This exhibit makes the Birmingham Zoo a national leader in the care and breeding of elephants.

After the completion of the main exhibit in early 2011, the 50-year-old pachyderm building was renovated to allow staff to provide a higher quality of care for the three southern white rhinoceroses and the one now-deceased Nile hippo that resided there. A new giraffe yard, added in April 2012, allows the zoo's young herd to continue to grow and a new feeding platform was added for visitors to have the chance to feed them. Tadpole the hippo was euthanized due to old age in June 2020, and all three southern white rhinos (Max, Laptop, and Ajabu) were permanently transferred to a private conservation facility in December 2021 with the intention for the zoo to switch back to black rhinos, which were at the zoo until 2009. They currently reside on a 450-acre rhinoceros preserve at Texas Christian University. A pair of eastern black rhinos moved into that paddock (including the former hippopotamus habitat as part of its expansion). It opened on March 25, 2023. Moyo died in late January 2024, leaving Kesi as the zoo's only rhinoceros until a new Eastern black rhinoceros named Hatari arrived in November 2026.

- Boma Yard
- Kiwanis Giraffe Encounter: Reticulated giraffes
- Main Elephant Yard: African bush elephants
- Rhinoceros Habitat: Eastern black rhinoceros
- Savannah Hoofstock Yards: Grant's zebras, ostriches, duikers and tortoises
List of animals

Birds

- African pygmy goose
- American flamingo
- Barn owl
- Barred owl
- Beautiful fruit dove
- Black crowned crane
- Black vulture
- Black-billed magpie
- Black-naped fruit dove
- Black-necked swan
- Blue crane
- Blue-bellied roller
- Blue-crowned motmot
- Blue-faced honeyeater
- Buff-crested bustard
- Cape thick-knee
- Chicken
- Cinereous vulture
- Coconut lorikeet
- Common ostrich
- Eastern screech owl
- Emerald starling
- Eurasian eagle-owl
- Forsten's lorikeet
- Golden eagle
- Great horned owl
- Green aracari
- Green wood hoopoe
- Harris's hawk
- Helmeted guineafowl
- Jambu fruit dove
- Kori bustard
- Lady Ross' turaco
- Laughing kookaburra
- Marbled teal
- Marigold lorikeet
- Masked lapwing
- Mute swan
- Nicobar pigeon
- North American ruddy duck
- Pheasant pigeon
- Pied imperial pigeon
- Plush-crested jay
- Red-billed hornbill
- Red-billed leiothrix
- Red-crested cardinal
- Red-crested turaco
- Red-crowned crane
- Red-shouldered hawk
- Red-tailed hawk
- Roseate spoonbill
- Sandhill crane
- Secretary bird
- Southern ground hornbill
- Southern screamer
- Speckled mousebird
- Spectacled owl
- Sulphur-crested cockatoo
- Sunbittern
- Tawny frogmouth
- Taveta golden weaver
- Vasa parrot
- Victoria crowned pigeon
- Violet-backed starling
- White-crested laughingthrush
- White-headed buffalo weaver
- White-naped crane
- White-throated ground dove
- Wild turkey
- Wood stork

Mammals

- African bush elephant
- African lion
- American black bear
- Binturong
- Black howler
- Blackbelly sheep
- Black-footed cat
- Black-handed spider monkey
- Blue duiker
- Bobcat
- Cape porcupine
- Common squirrel monkey
- Cotton-top tamarin
- Coyote
- Crowned lemur
- De Brazza's monkey
- Eastern black rhinoceros
- Eastern bongo
- Fennec fox
- Fishing cat
- Giant anteater
- Giant otter
- Grant's zebra
- Gulf Coast Native sheep
- Hoffmann's two-toed sloth
- Lar gibbon
- Nigerian Dwarf goat
- Lesser hedgehog tenrec
- North American river otter
- Pallas's cat
- Prevost's squirrel
- Red panda
- Red-flanked duiker
- Reticulated giraffe
- Ring-tailed lemur
- Sand cat
- Serval
- Southern three-banded armadillo
- Striped skunk
- Sumatran orangutan

Reptiles

- African pancake tortoise
- Aldabra giant tortoise
- Alligator snapping turtle
- American alligator
- Blood python
- Blue-tongued skink
- Caiman lizard
- Cave dwelling rat snake
- Coahuilan box turtle
- Cottonmouth
- Desert tortoise
- Eastern indigo snake
- Egyptian tortoise
- Emerald tree boa
- Garden tree boa
- Gopher tortoise
- Green anaconda
- Home's hinge-back tortoise
- Japanese pond turtle
- Komodo dragon
- Mexican beaded lizard
- New Caledonian giant gecko
- Philippine sailfin lizard
- Prehensile-tailed skink
- Radiated tortoise
- Red-tailed ratsnake
- San Esteban chuckwalla
- Timber rattlesnake

Amphibians

- Asian giant toad
- Yellow-banded poison dart frog

Fish

- Rainbow shark
- Red lionfish

== Other facilities and activities ==
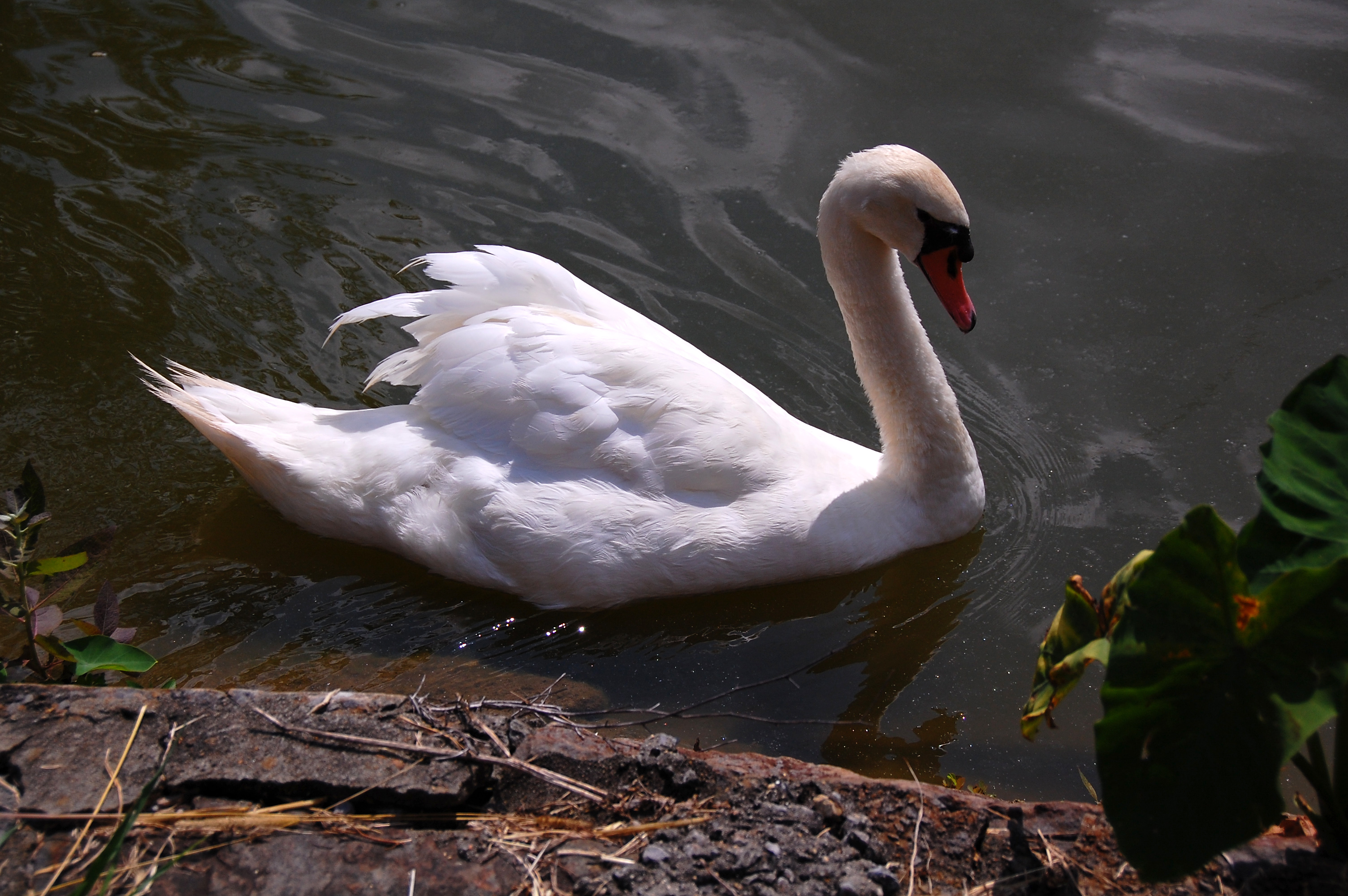
Mute swan (Cygnus olor) in a pond at the zoo.

- Birmingham Zoo Express/Red Diamond Express trains - 2 ft (610 mm) narrow gauge prior to 1976 gauge was 16 in (406 mm)
- Carousel
- Primary Giftshop
- Nourish 205 Cafe
- Lorikeet Feeding (open seasonally)
- Wild Burger Cafe
- Safari Peak Pavilion
- Sea Lion Show (ended in 2024)
- Tiki Hut Giftshop (open seasonally)
- Wildlife Show

== Incidents ==
On February 15, 2006, a zookeeper was taken to the hospital for minor injuries after being mauled by the resident female lion, Sheeba.

On September 16, 2019, two white-crested laughing thrushes were discovered missing from their habitat. It is unknown whether the birds were taken or flew off once their containment was compromised.

On July 18, 2022, the zoo's sixteen-year-old lioness Akili was fatally injured due to a confrontation with its new residential male lion, Josh. Hollie Colahan, the zoo's deputy director at the time, stated, "Unfortunately, Akili sustained serious injuries within the first few minutes of the meeting and despite immediate intervention by the Animal Care and Animal Health teams, she succumbed to her injuries and died Monday afternoon."
