= Green frog =

Green frog or Green Frog, may refer to:

== Frogs ==
- A green frog
- Pelophylax, a true frog genus in the family Ranidae found in the Old World
  - Specifically, the edible frog (P. kl. esculenta), the most common Pelophylax of Europe
- Lithobates clamitans (also called Rana clamitans), a true frog species in the family Ranidae of North America
- Litoria aurea, a Hylidae ("true tree frog") species of Australia, also known as green and golden bell frog, green bell frog or green and golden swamp frog
- Common green frog (Hylarana erythraea, also called Rana erythraea)

== Places ==
- The Green Frog (restaurant, founded 1938), Waycross, Georgia, USA; a restaurant founded by William Darden
- Green Frog Historic Village, Crockett County, Tennessee, USA; see Louise Pearson Memorial Arboretum

== Vehicles and transport ==
- Green Frog Hybrid Buses, a Philippine intercity bus company
- "The Green Frog" (locomotive), a preserved locomotive in Corrimal, New South Wales, Australia
- "Green Frog" (train; Japanese: 「青ガエル」), a Toyoko Line train set of the Tokyu 5000 series (2002) electric multiple unit
- "Green Frog" (train; Japanese: 「青ガエル」), a Toyoko Line train service using the Tokyu 5000 series (1954) electric multiple unit

== Other uses ==
- Green Frog (short story collection), a 2024 book by Gina Chung
- Green Frog Service, a ceramic service set for Catherine the Great, the Empress of Russia by Wedgwood of England
- Green Frog, a fictional character from the video game The Moron Test
- "Green Frog", a song from the soundtrack of the 2011 film Warrior Baek Dong-soo
- Green frog seal, the Rainforest Alliance Certified Seal

== See also ==
- "Green Frog 2021" (song), a 2021 single by Tritops
- Green Toad (disambiguation)
