= Brevard Zoo =

Zoo in Melbourne, Florida, United States

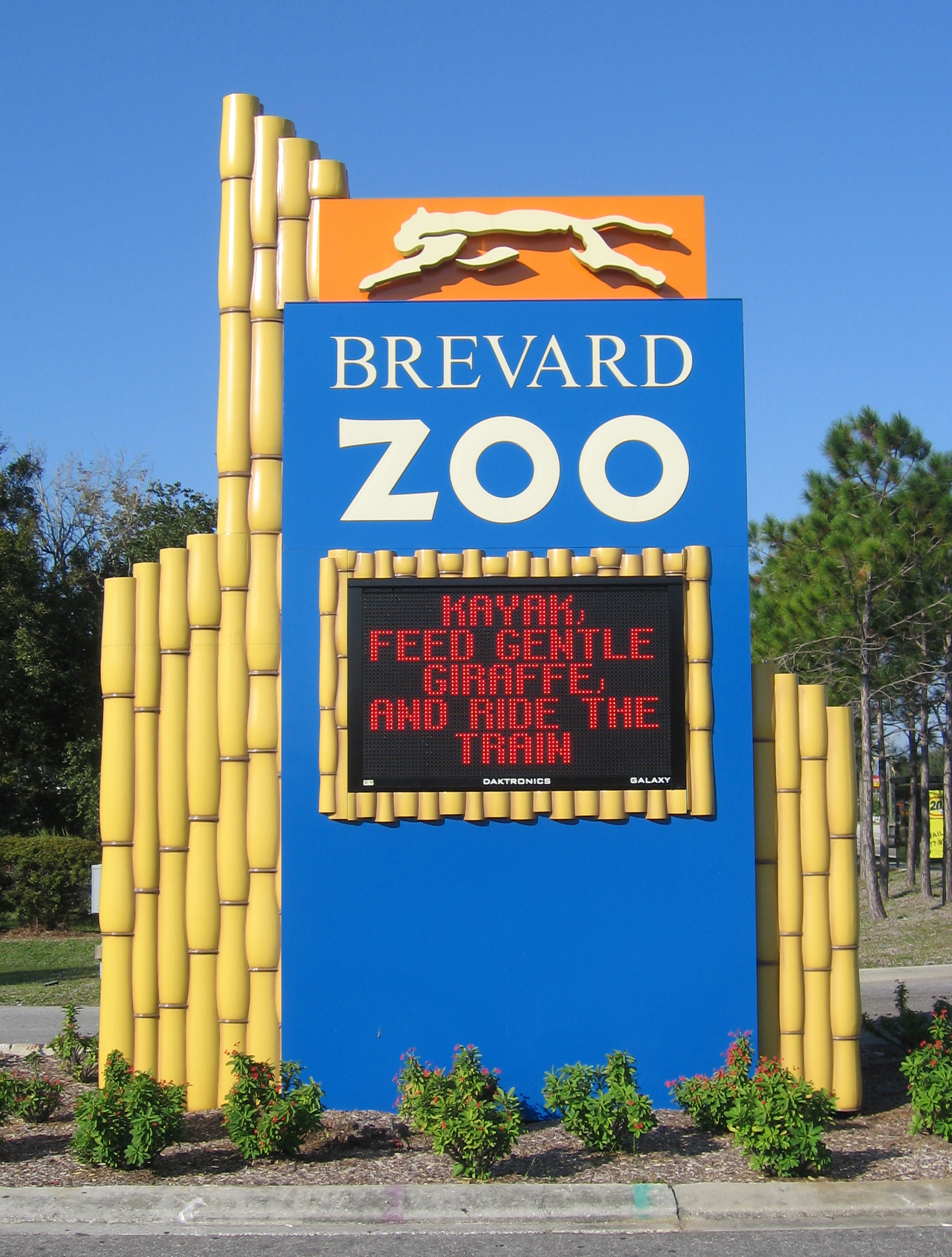
- Brevard Zoo Monument sign at entrance
- Interactive map of Brevard Zoo
- 28.225089°N 80.713978°W
- Date opened: March 26, 1994
- Location: 8225 North Wickham Road; Melbourne, Florida, U.S.
- Land area: 75 acres (30.4 ha)
- No. of animals: 790
- No. of species: 171
- Annual visitors: 526,000 (2022)
- Memberships: AZA
- Website: brevardzoo.org

The Brevard Zoo is a nonprofit zoological organization accredited by the Association of Zoos and Aquariums, and is located on 75-acres (30 ha) of land in Melbourne, Florida.

The zoo is currently home to more than 900 animals that represent over 170 species from five continents (including the state of Florida).

The zoo features animal feedings, kayak tours, behind-the-scenes experiences, and the TreeTop Trek (an aerial ropes course).

Among other special events, the zoo has also featured travelling dinosaur exhibits several times over the years, which includes "Dinosaurs are Back", which ran from November 2017 to April 2018.

Currently, the zoo is divided into five major areas. Expedition Africa, Lands of Change: Australia and Beyond, Wild Florida, Rainforest Revealed, and Paws On; and a smaller one-off walking trail (Treasures of the Caribbean). All of these areas are accessed off of the main loop that encircles a large pond for Chilean flamingos.

== History ==
In 1986, the East Coast Zoological Society of Florida, Inc. (ECZS) formed. One of their goals was to build a zoo for Brevard County to "serve as a conversation hub where people could gather to learn about animals and nature. A place to escape from the manmade world and reconnect with the diversity of the life with which we share this planet." In 1992, construction of the zoo began, with over 16,000 people coming together to help build the zoo. The Brevard Zoo claims to have had "The World's Largest Volunteer Community Build". Brevard Zoo celebrated its grand opening on March 26, 1994.

A record 328,973 visitors attended in 2007. This included 175,046 paid daily guests. The others included reciprocal members of other zoos, and annual members. The zoo has an annual budget of $5 million most of which is earned and not raised through fundraising or grants.

In October 2012, one of the southern white rhinos from this zoo was transferred to Alabama's Birmingham Zoo to take part in a breeding program with its two female southern white rhinos. In 2014, the black-throated monitor died. It was donated to the zoo when it was two years old in 2005. In 2017, the zoo renovated the original Australia-Asia exhibit and reopened the area as "Lands of Change: Australia and Beyond".

== Zoo Layout ==
=== Expedition Africa ===
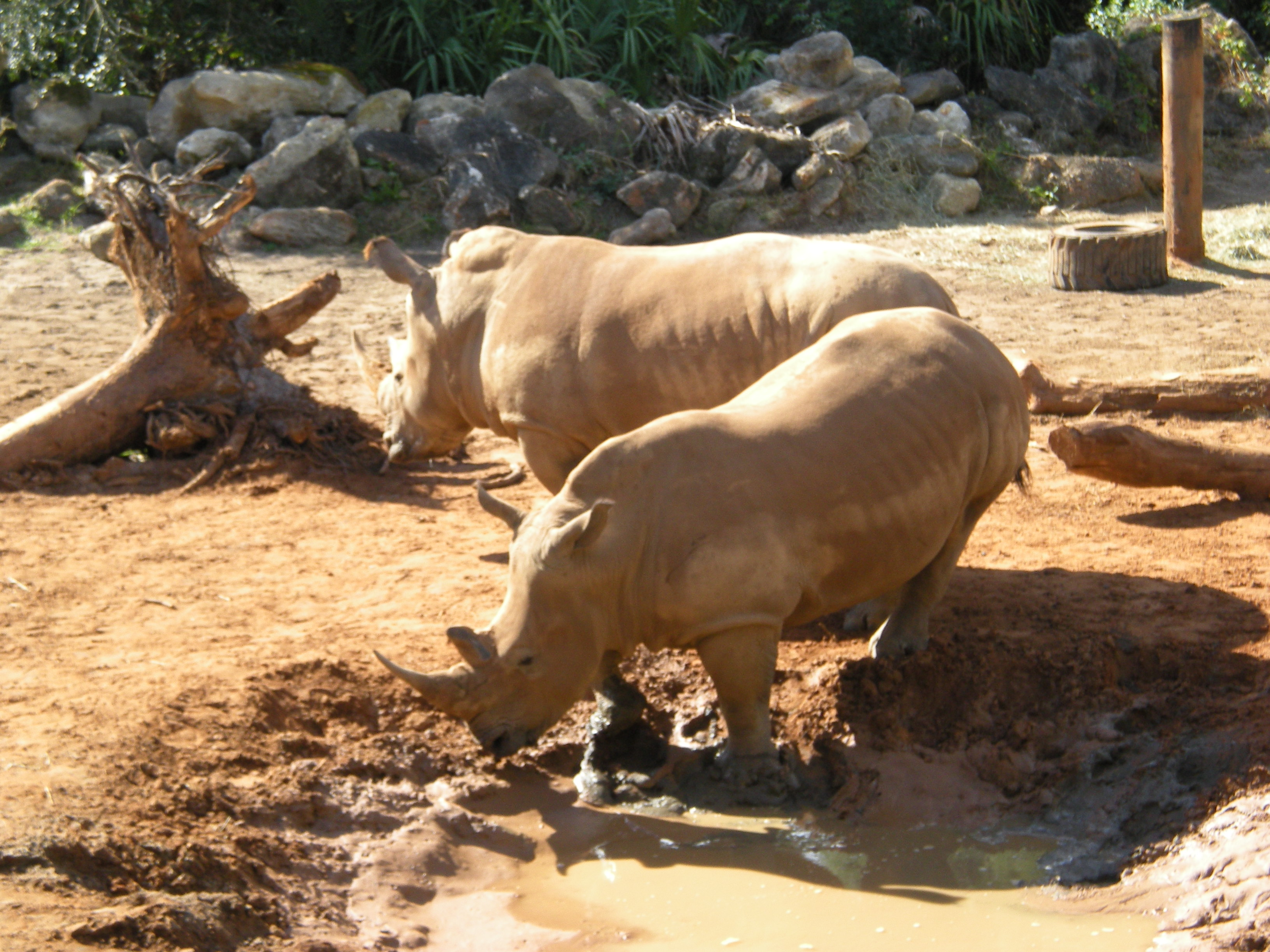
White rhinos in Expedition Africa.

Opening in 2003 as an expansion to the original zoo. Expedition Africa provides a dynamic set of interactive experiences that complement the resident animals.

Expedition Africa is where the zoo provides giraffe feeding, as well as specialized “daily adventures” such as kayaking across a man-made river, and up-close encounters with certain animals like the white rhinos and okapi.

Looping around the back end of Expedition Africa is the zoo’s miniature train ride, Cape to Cairo Express, which takes visitors on a 10-minute excursion to view animals not easily accessible from the main boardwalk; such as bongos, dromedary camels, and Ankole-Watusi cattle.

Since they first arrived in 2020, the zoo’s bongos have successfully produced offspring to this very day; with a notable bongo birth occurring on November 12, 2024.

On November 16, 2024, the zoo opened up an extension of their existing boardwalk and a permanent (15,150 sq. ft) habitat for their lions, who were previously housed in the Wild Florida loop.

List of animals

Mammals

- Lion
- Masai giraffe
- Okapi
- Southern white rhinoceros
- Bongo (antelope)
- Ankole-Watusi (cattle)
- Dromedary camel
- Impala
- Grévy's zebra
- Scimitar-horned oryx
- Klipspringer
- Meerkat
- Ring-tailed lemur
- Red ruffed lemur
- Cape porcupine
- Mantled guereza

Birds

- Black crowned crane
- Crested guineafowl
- Common ostrich
- Southern ground hornbill

Reptiles

- Burmese python
- Leopard tortoise
- Radiated tortoise

Invertebrates

- Madagascar hissing cockroach

=== Macaws & Lemur Island ===
In between the entrances of Expedition Africa and Lands of Change, there are open-topped habitats for several species of macaw. Additionally, there is also an island that once displayed a pair of siamangs. After the zoo’s last siamang departed for the Audubon Zoo, the island became the new home for some of the zoo’s ring-tailed lemurs.

=== Lands of Change: Australia and Beyond ===
Opening as Australasia in 1996, the area received its current name following a significant renovation to the area that opened to the public on May 27, 2017.

This loop features a geographical mix of animals from Australia, Southeast Asia, and the Americas; a slight deviation from the usually-straightforward theme of the other major areas.

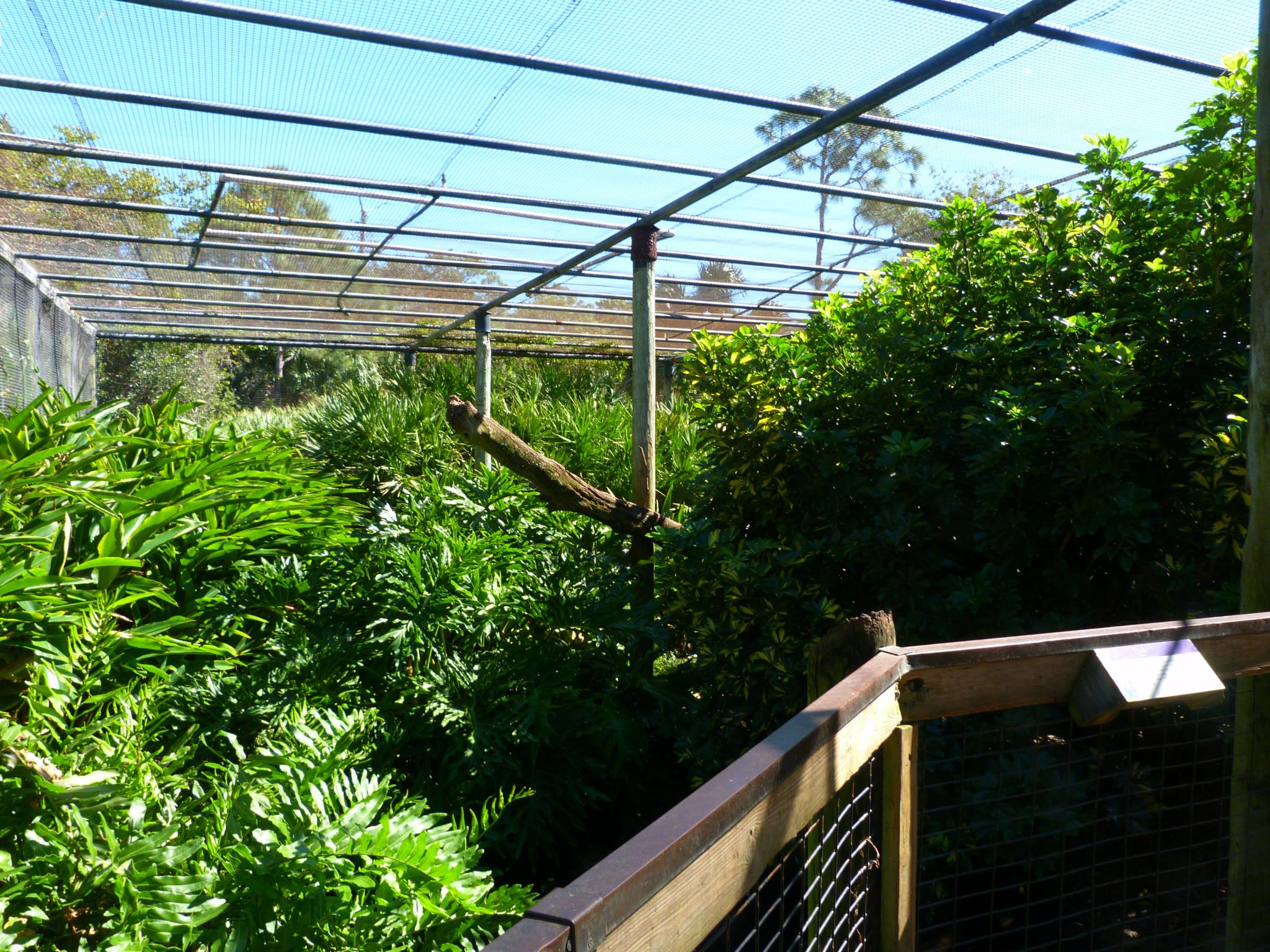
A view inside of the aviary.

Lands of Change is notable for its large free-flight aviary, where visitors can have the option to walk through and feed birds such as the cockatiel and rainbow lorikeet. The aviary is further divided into two separate sides; Lorikeet Landing, and Cockatiel Creek, both of which are home to large breeding flocks of the respective species.

Across from the aviary, is the Kangaroo Walkabout; a walkthrough habitat where guests can get up-close and personal with emus, red kangaroos, and more. Occurring daily from 10-11 AM, the zoo’s popular kangaroo feedings occur within the walkthrough (until sold out).

Inside the walkabout, several solar panel “trees” are present throughout; these “trees”, which were donated to the zoo by Florida Power and Light, provide shade for the resident animals, as well as providing all of the energy needed to power the nearby komodo dragon house.

Near the end of the loop, rotational habitats for dingos and babirusas, as well as an amphitheater where daily demonstrations take place are also present.

List of animals

Mammals

- Dingo
- Red kangaroo
- North Sulawesi babirusa
- Reeve's muntjac
- Western grey kangaroo

Birds

- Black swan
- Coconut lorikeet
- Cockatiel
- Emu
- Laughing kookaburra
- Masked lapwing
- Nicobar pigeon
- Orinoco goose
- Princess parrot
- Rainbow lorikeet
- Roseate spoonbill
- Scarlet ibis
- Salmon-crested cockatoo
- Tawny frogmouth
- Wrinkled Hornbill
- Victoria crowned pigeon
- Fulvous whistling duck

Reptiles

- Komodo dragon
- Galapagos giant tortoise
- Emydura macquarii
- Red-footed tortoise

=== Wild Florida ===
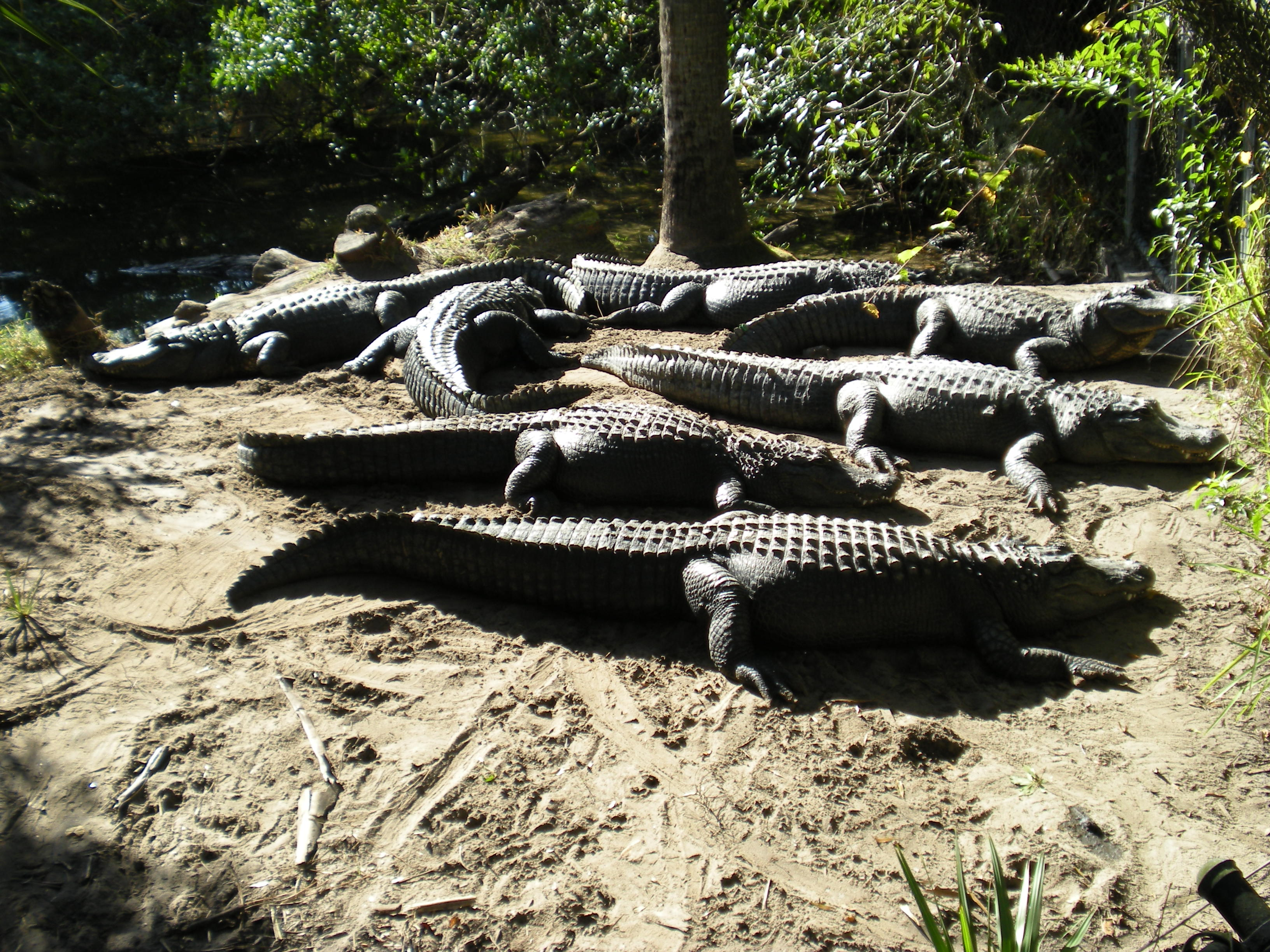
American alligators in a Wild Florida habitat.

Opening as one of the zoo’s original attractions in 1994, Wild Florida is the only major loop that has not yet seen a major redevelopment. This does not mean the loop has not received any changes whatsoever since that time, however; for the zoo has invested in smaller additions and refurbished habitats that directly benefit the zoo’s conservation efforts and general wellbeing of the resident animals.

Wild Florida is essentially the zoo’s “native” animal loop; which subsequently highlights certain animals associated with, and (mostly) local to the State of Florida.

Sharing the following habitats with the neighboring Rainforest Revealed, a large lagoon serves as the first impression for these two major loops. Visitors cross over a narrow boardwalk over this lagoon to enter and exit this loop, all while passing by American alligators and American crocodiles on either side.

In 2021, the zoo’s North American river otters fell ill and succumbed to their illnesses unexpectedly. As of 2025, their former habitat has been converted into a home for an alligator snapping turtle.

After arriving from their original home at the Naples Zoo (where they were born), Chobe, Karoo, and Ruaha, the zoo’s lion brothers would move into a specially-built (albeit, temporary) habitat while the zoo could afford the funds to build them a permanent space in Expedition Africa. In 2024, the zoo was able to succeed on this promise, and subsequently moved the brothers to their new home in time for its opening.

For a short time after the lions departed; “Pepper” the zoo’s last cheetah moved to the lions’ old digs from a temporary enclosure in the Rainforest Revealed. Pepper would live out her days in this habitat until her death in March 2025, which marked the end of the zoo’s relationship with captive cheetahs.

In addition to the native wildlife, Wild Florida is also home to the “Adventure Outpost”, where visitors can choose to either take an aerial adventure through the Treetop Trek, or to chart a kayaking course through a zoo-protected wetland.

One of the zoo’s leading conservation efforts involves the release and rehabilitation of rescued American black bears. However, not every bear is able to be successfully released, which is how the zoo’s resident bears came to live here. Currently, the zoo maintains Cheyenne, Brody, and Betty, who are all non-releasable bears, with each one serving as an ambassador for their wild counterparts.

List of animals

Mammals

- American black bear
- Axis deer
- Bobcat
- White-tailed deer

Birds

- Bald eagle
- Crested caracara
- Sandhill crane
- Wild turkey

Reptiles

- American alligator
- American crocodile
- Alligator snapping turtle
- Gulf Coast box turtle

=== Rainforest Revealed ===
Giant anteater (Myrmecophaga tridactyla) searches for ants in Rainforest Revealed. (Video)

Originally Rainforest Revealed was called La Selva (“The Forest” in Spanish), opening with the rest of the zoo in 1994. Today, Rainforest Revealed is the most biodiverse of the zoo’s major areas, and highlights a variety of fauna from Central and South America.

Across the Rainforest Revealed, several habitats throughout this loop (especially for the primates) are rotational, which provides a dynamic, interconnected environment for both the animals and visitors alike.

The Brevard Zoo has had a long-standing relationship with spider monkeys, which includes captive breeding (they’re an endangered species); and taking in orphaned infants confiscated from the illegal wildlife trade.

Currently, the Brevard Zoo is home to two jaguars. A male named Khan (who came from the Birmingham Zoo); and a female named Lua, who was imported from Zoo de Granby.

On November 16, 2019, the loop received a significant facelift and expansion to the existing "La Selva" footprint. Among the new additions were the arrival of two giant otters, giant freshwater fish, and additional trails and habitats for the jaguars, primates, and more.

=== Caribbean Trail ===
Opened in November 2013, the “Treasures of the Caribbean” trail is the smallest of the zoo’s exhibit areas, and consists of a single non-looping pathway that leads to a dead-end.

Alongside the smaller roster of animals, this exhibit also features a pirate-themed scavenger hunt, which provides the area with a consistent theme.

List of animals

Birds

- Blue-crowned conure
- Yellow-headed amazon

Reptiles

- Grand Cayman blue iguana

=== Paws On ===
Paws On opened alongside Wild Florida and La Selva (now Rainforest Revealed) in 1994.

Paws On is home to an outdoor aquarium themed around the nearby Indian River Lagoon, which displays local marine life such as tarpon, stingrays, and black drums. Near this aquarium, a viewing tank for horseshoe crabs is also present.

Paws On also features a variety of non-animal attractions dedicated for children of all ages; which includes a playground, a shallow swimming area that serves as a splash pad, and more.

Over the years, the zoo’s barnyard (petting zoo) has been home to a mix of numerous domesticated animals, for example goats and chickens, along with exotic animals like tortoises and ambassador animals (sloths, skunks, etc.)

Outside of Paws On’s entrance, there are two dining areas. The first is "Slice", a pizza restaurant; while the other is "Cones", which offers soft-serve ice cream, Dole whips, and alcoholic beverages.

List of animals

Mammals

- Domestic goat

Birds

- Domestic chicken

Reptiles

- African spurred tortoise

Fish

- Atlantic tarpon
- Atlantic stingray
- Black drum
- Archosargus probatocephalus
- Lagodon rhomboides
- Mangrove snapper
- Common snook

Invertebrates

- Atlantic horseshoe crab
- Melongena corona

== Operations ==
The zoo received 363,426 visitors in 2011, up 5% from the previous year. This represented the second highest number of visitors on record.
