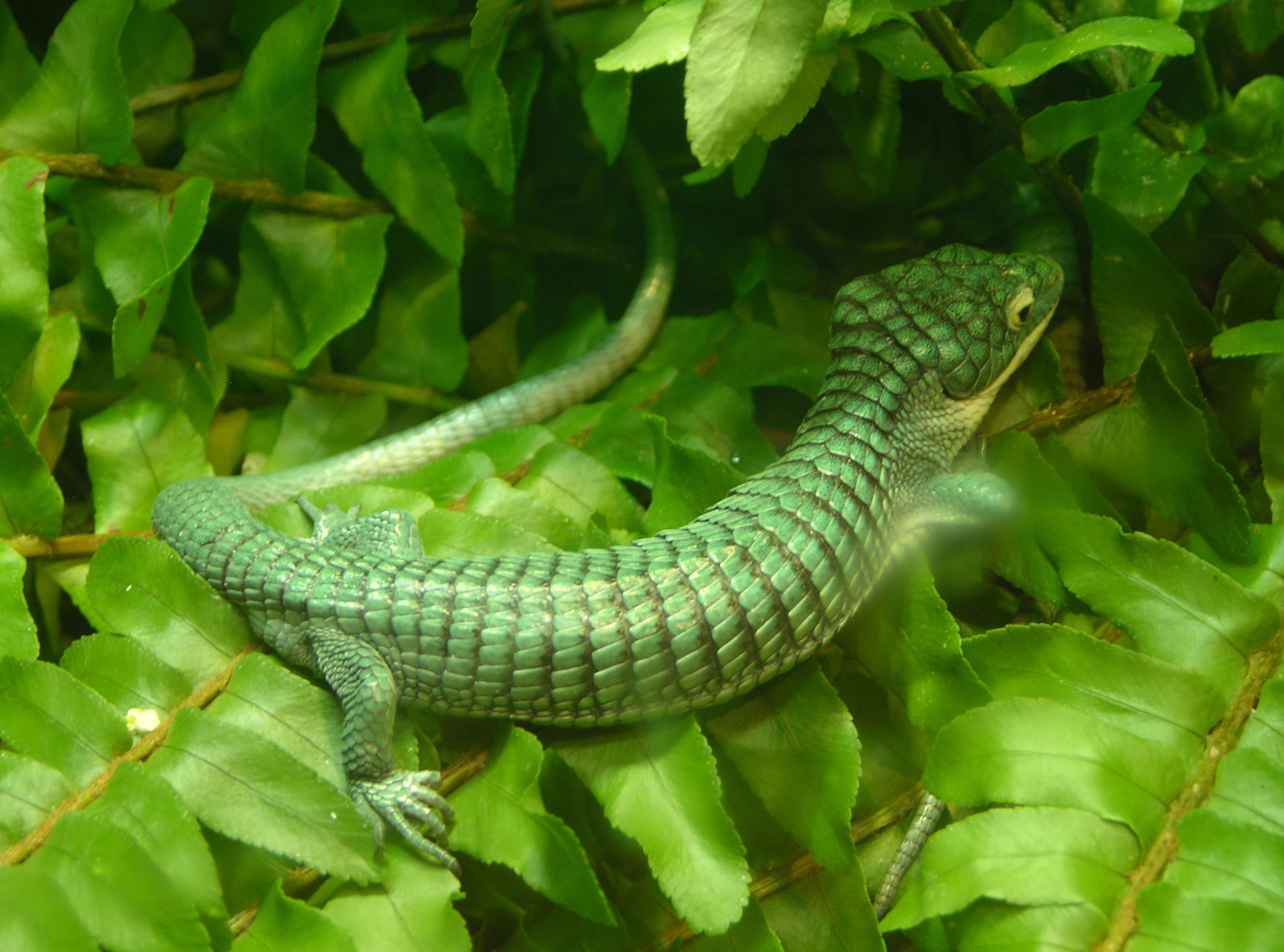
- Abronia graminea

Conservation status
- Endangered (IUCN 3.1)
- CITES Appendix II

Scientific classification
- Kingdom: Animalia
- Phylum: Chordata
- Class: Reptilia
- Order: Squamata
- Suborder: Anguimorpha
- Family: Anguidae
- Genus: Abronia
- Species: A. graminea

Binomial name
- Abronia graminea Cope, 1864

= Mexican alligator lizard =

Species of lizard

The Mexican alligator lizard (Abronia graminea), also known as the green arboreal alligator lizard, is an endangered species of lizard endemic to the Sierra Madre de Oaxaca highlands of Mexico. It can be found in the states of Puebla, Veracruz, and Oaxaca. It was originally described under the genus Gerrhonotus as Gerrhonotus gramineus by Edward D. Cope in 1864.

The Mexican alligator lizard adopts an arboreal lifestyle and is commonly found inhabiting the bromeliads among mesic cloud or pine-oak forest canopies. This habitat offers a humid temperate climate with summer rains. The preferred diet of this species is a variety of insects. Colour patterns of the Mexican alligator lizard can range from bright emerald green to dark teal blue; juvenile colouration is a tan ground colour with dark crossbands.

The IUCN rates the Mexican alligator lizard as endangered. Decline of the species is mainly the result of habitat fragmentation due to fire, deforestation, and land use change for agriculture. Illegal trafficking for the pet trade has also contributed to the status of this species.

== Taxonomy ==
The genus Abronia was first described by John Edward Gray in 1838. In 1864, Edward D. Cope described a new species: Gerrhonotus gramineus. This name was used in subsequent literature until 1949, where it was then re-classified under the genus Abronia. In 1949, Tihen reported this species as Abronia taeniata graminea. Tihen considered A. graminea to be a subspecies of A. taeniata based on observations of four specimens collected in Veracruz, Mexico, exhibiting morphological characteristics of both species. Additional literature published after Tihen (1949) also reported the name A. taeniata graminea to reflect these potential intergrades. However, Martin's observations in 1955 argued that A. graminea was not a subspecies of A. taeniata based on clear morphological differences, and re-elevated A. graminea to species status. Currently, the Mexican alligator lizard's valid taxonomic identifier is Abronia graminea.

A. graminea is one of 29 species described in this genus. Little is known about its relation to other Abronia species. Its distribution range has been shown to overlap with that of A. taeniata. These two species can be distinguished by the number of transverse dorsal scale rows, longitudinal nuchal scale rows, and adult dorsal body colourations. Individuals of A. graminea have 25-29 transverse dorsal scale rows, while A. taeniata has 30-36; 4-6 longitudinal nuchal scale rows in A. graminea, and 6 in A. taeniata; adult dorsal body colour is uniform in A. graminea whereas A. taeniata adult dorsal body colour includes dark crossbands.

== Common names ==
Language	Name
English	Mexican alligator lizard Green arboreal alligator lizard Terrestrial arboreal alligator lizard
Spanish	Escorpión arboricola de Tehuacá Dragoncito del Sur de la Sierra Madre Oriental Lagarto alicante terrestre

== Description ==
The Mexican alligator lizard has a dorsoventrally depressed body with a flattened, triangular head and weak lateral fold. It reaches up to about 10.6 cm (4.2 in) in snout–vent length and 16.0 cm (6.3 in) in tail length. An individual that had a snout–vent length of 9.8 cm (3.9 in) weighed 21.2 g (0.75 oz) and another with a snout–vent length of 10.0 cm (3.9 in) weighed 20.7 g (0.73 oz). This species has a prehensile tail, that can be regrown if lost, and long, strong limbs and digits ideal for its arboreal habitat. The adult colour pattern varies significantly from the juvenile colouration. Adult males are typically bright emerald green while females exhibit colour variations that include bright to dull orange on the dorsal side. Other colour elements present in adults include bright yellow orbital skin, blue highlights on the supralabial scales, and yellow snout, lower jaw, and throat. Dorsal scales contain variable amounts of dark pigmentation on the basal half of the scales. Females of this species occasionally retain dark crossbands characteristic of juvenile colour patterns. Juveniles typically express a light tan ground colour with 9 irregular black crossbands on the body and 19 on the tail, and a dirty yellow ventrum.

Typical scale patterns for A. graminea includes:

- 12 longitudinal rows of ventral scales
- 25-29 transverse dorsal scale rows
- 4-6 longitudinal nuchal scale rows
- 12-14 longitudinal dorsal scale rows
- 11 supralabial scales
- 2 rows of infralabial scales (5 scales in 1st row, 6 scales in 2nd row)

The preauricular scales are granular, and the dorsal scales are slightly keeled. The plates of the head are often thickened and roughed, giving the head a triangular appearance. Typically, the dorsal scales are larger than the ventrals.

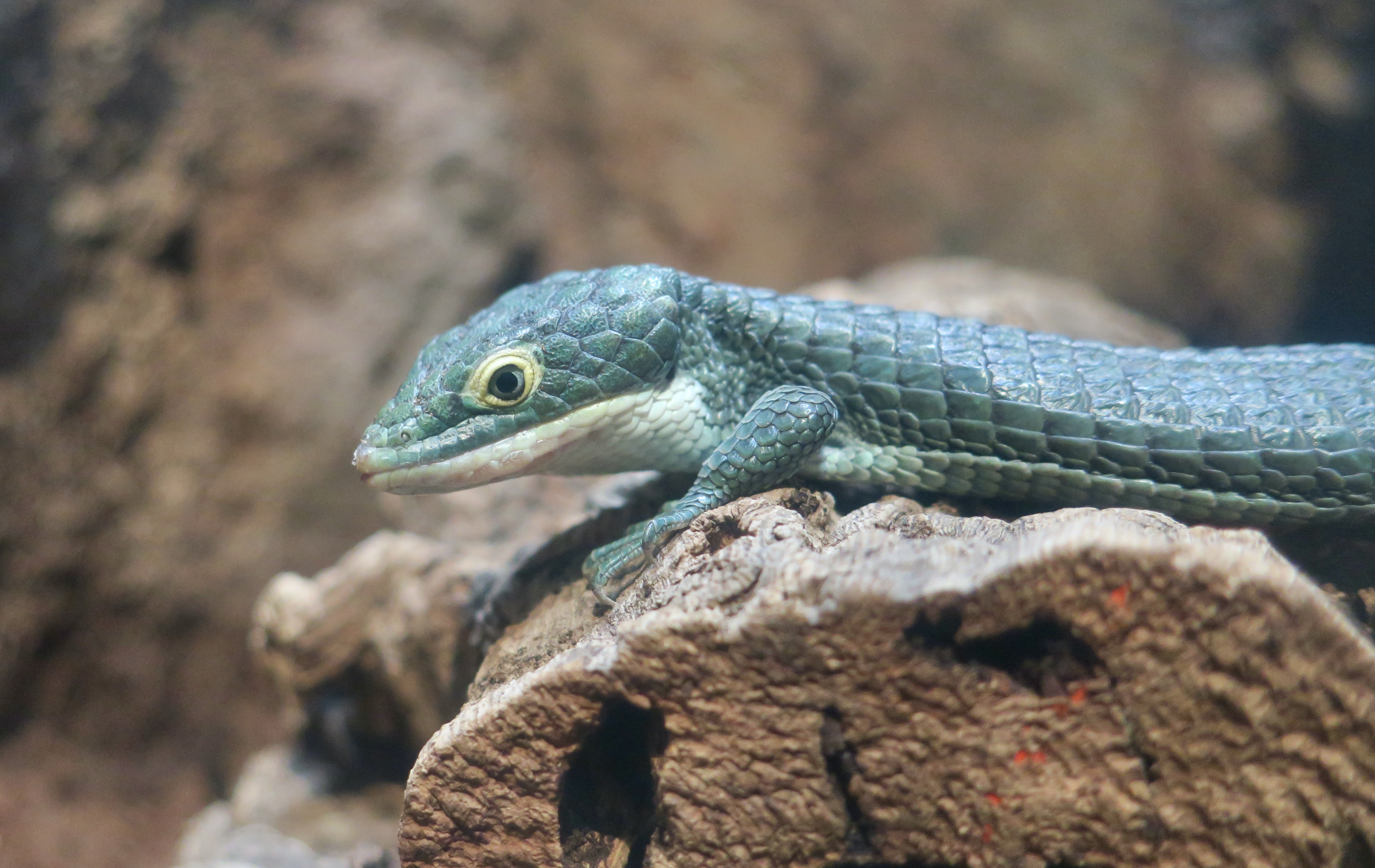
Closeup portrait at Wildlife World Zoo.

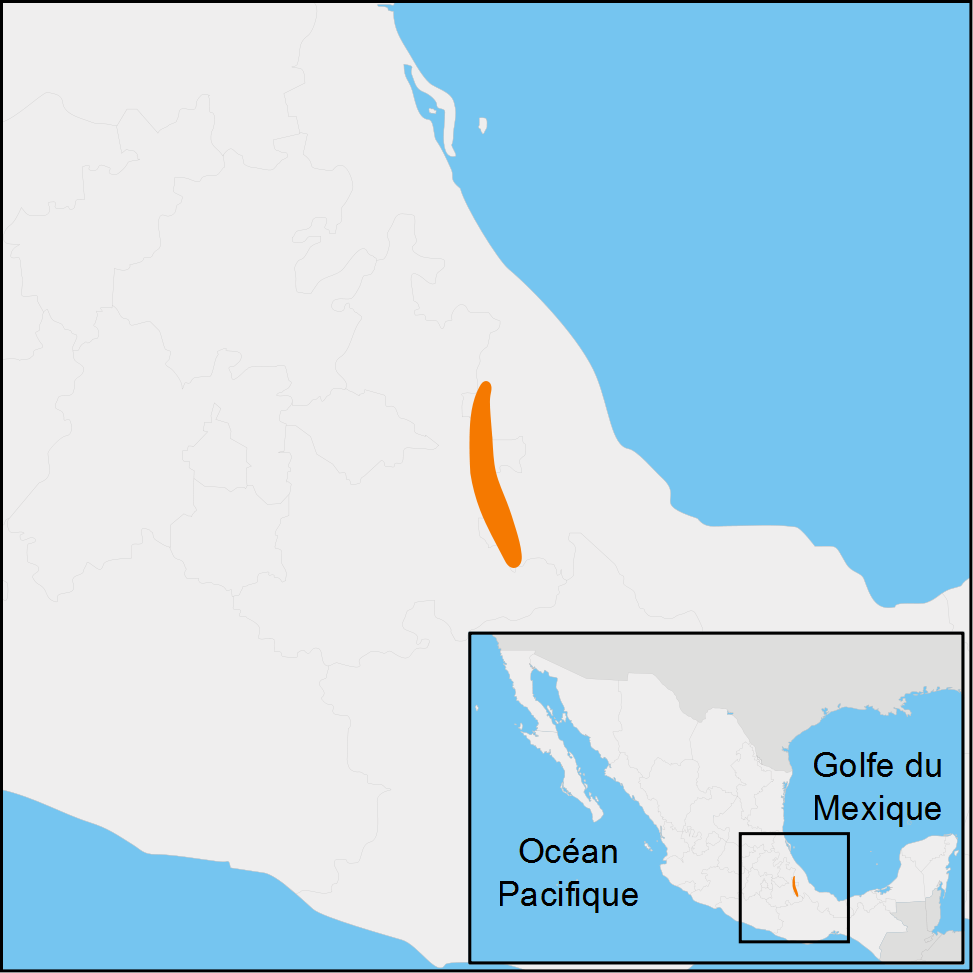
Distribution range of the Mexican alligator lizard in the states of Puebla, Veracruz, and Oaxaca.

== Distribution ==
The Mexican alligator lizard is a widely distributed species endemic to the highlands of Mexico along the Sierra Madre de Oaxaca mountain range. It has an estimated distribution of approximately 11,500 km^{2}. This range include the states of Puebla, Veracruz, and Oaxaca. The region this species inhabits is located at elevations of 1,350-2,743m above sea level.

== Ecology ==
=== Habitat ===
The Mexican alligator lizard occurs in mesic, montane forest environments. It is typically found in cloud forests or pine–oak forests within humid temperate climates that may experience dramatic changes in temperature between day and night. This arboreal species is located among epiphytic vegetation, particularly bromeliads, but also lichens and orchids. This arboreal species can be found at heights of 40m in forest canopies. A. graminea cannot thrive in a degraded habitat.

=== Diet ===
In captivity, A. graminea typically feeds on a variety of insects and other arthropods. Due to limited research, it is unknown what exact feeding strategies are used by this species.

=== Lifespan ===
Lifespan in the wild is unknown. In captivity, A. graminea has been reported to live up to 10 years.

=== Reproduction & lifecycle ===
A. graminea is considered to be viviparous (giving birth to live offspring). Typically, females become sexually mature in their 3rd year of life and can give birth to litters of 1-12 offspring. Although copulation has not been observed in the wild, mating typically occurs in the summer/fall, and parturition occurs in the spring. The gestation period for the Mexican alligator lizard is approximately 6–8 months.

== Conservation ==
=== Status ===
The Mexican alligator lizard is considered an Endangered species on the IUCN Red List. It is a protected animal under Mexican Federal Law as a Threatened species on the Norma Oficial Mexicana list.

=== Threats ===
Population fragmentation and destruction of habitat are the main factors contributing to the decline of this species. Forest fires, deforestation, and change of land use for agricultural purposes has degraded this habitat and reduced the distribution of A. graminea dramatically. Illegal international trade of A. graminea for the purpose of maintaining it as a pet has significantly contributed to the status of this species.
