= Babec =

First gorilla to receive a pacemaker

- Species: Western lowland gorilla
- Sex: male
- Born: December 22, 1979; Lincoln Park Zoo, Chicago, Illinois, United States
- Died: April 11, 2008 (aged 28); Birmingham Zoo, Birmingham, Alabama, United States

Babec (December 22, 1979 - April 11, 2008) was a male silverback western lowland gorilla (Gorilla gorilla gorilla), the youngest of three sons born to Otto and Benga at Chicago's Lincoln Park Zoo. Between 1988 and 1992 he sired 8 offspring, 5 of them with Madge of the Cincinnati Zoo. Six of his offspring survived into maturity, and he has one grandchild, Kiazi Kitamu at the Pittsburgh Zoo. Babec was exhibited at the Birmingham Zoo in Birmingham, Alabama, from 1993 until his death in 2008. He was the only gorilla to have been successfully fitted with a pacemaker, which he wore for four years.

In 2003, Babec was diagnosed with end-stage heart failure due to fibrosing cardiomyopathy after he exhibited symptoms including coughing, lethargy and loss of appetite and indications of chest pains. As part of his therapeutic diet, zoo veterinarian E. Marie Rush prescribed antacids, antibiotics, diuretics and two 30-oz servings of grape-flavor Powerade per day, which was donated by the Birmingham Coca-Cola Bottling Company.

On September 25, 2004, Babec became the first gorilla to undergo the successful implant of a cardiac resynchronization therapy device (a type of advanced pacemaker). The device was suggested and donated by its manufacturer, the Guidant Corporation. Guidant representatives Dr. Jeff Hall DVM, Linda Garmon, and Tab Whisenhunt provided technical expertise and support. It was implanted during a 6-hour operation performed at the zoo's veterinary hospital and led by University of Alabama at Birmingham cardiologist Neal Kay. He came through the operation well and special care was taken to modify his environment to minimize opportunities to jeopardize the procedure through strenuous arm activity. His fingernails were closely clipped and various distractions applied, such as fingernail color, shaved patches of hair and chewing gum in his fur, to distract him from manipulating his sutures.

In the spring of 2005 the wires connecting the CRT device to Babec's heart were loosened in a friendly tussle with the zoo's younger gorilla, Jamie. The damage was evident because of the return of Babec's symptoms. The damage was corrected surgically and zoo staff made the decision to alternate Babec's and Jamie's exhibit times.

On April 29, 2007, the CRT device was again replaced in a 7-hour procedure.

Babec was euthanized on April 11, 2008, after his health declined dramatically over three weeks.
