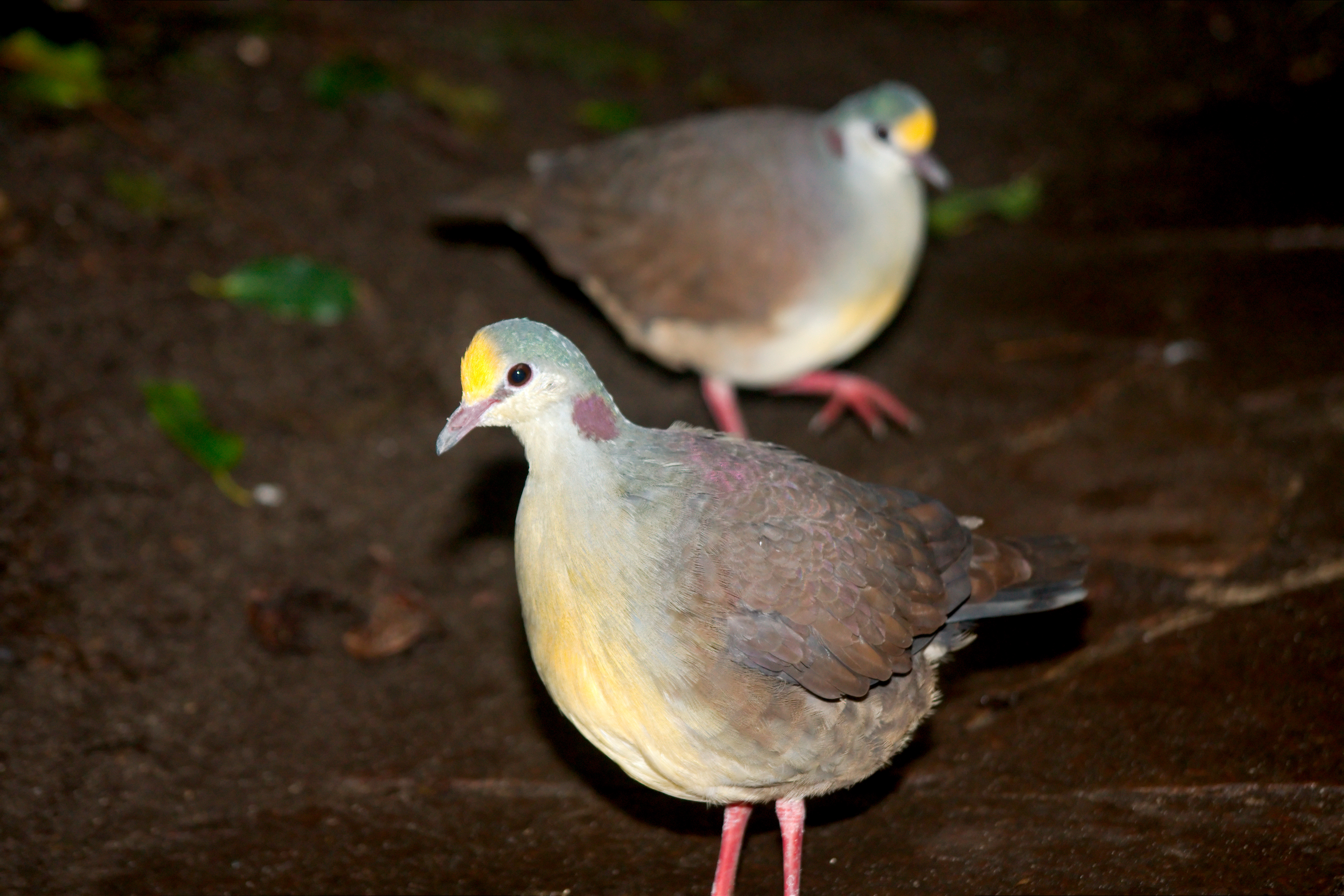

Conservation status
- Least Concern (IUCN 3.1)

Scientific classification
- Kingdom: Animalia
- Phylum: Chordata
- Class: Aves
- Order: Columbiformes
- Family: Columbidae
- Genus: Gallicolumba
- Species: G. tristigmata

Binomial name
- Gallicolumba tristigmata (Bonaparte, 1855)

= Sulawesi ground dove =

Species of bird

The Sulawesi ground dove (Gallicolumba tristigmata), also known as the yellow-breasted ground dove, is a medium-sized (approximately 35 cm), ground-dwelling dove. It is mostly olive-brown with a golden forehead, iridescent bluish-green crown and nape, purple patch on the side of the neck, yellow breast, dark brown tail, white underparts, and red legs. Both sexes are similar.

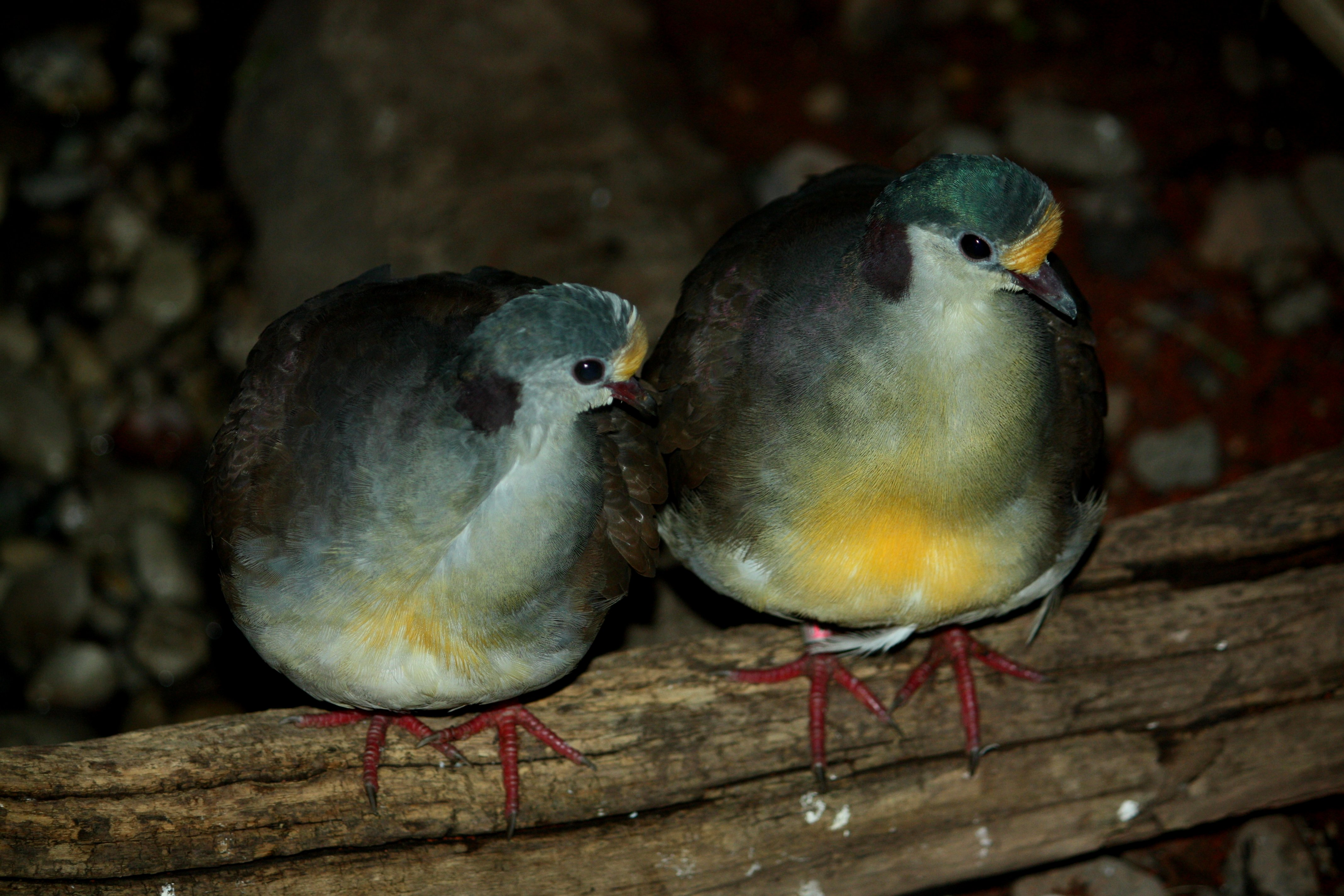
A pair of Sulawesi ground doves in Louisville Zoo, USA.

An Indonesian endemic, this elusive species is distributed in primary rainforests of Sulawesi in Wallacea. The Sulawesi ground dove is a terrestrial bird. Its diet consists mainly of seeds and fallen fruits. The female lays a single white egg.

The Sulawesi ground dove is evaluated as of least concern on the IUCN Red List of Threatened Species.
