= Green toad =

Green toad can refer to multiple species of toad, all formerly included in the genus Bufo:

- Anaxyrus debilis, the North American green toad, from Mexico and the United States
- Anaxyrus retiformis, the Sonoran green toad, from Mexico and the United States
- Bufotes, the Eurasian green toads or Palearctic green toads, several species from Europe, Asia and northern Africa
- Incilius coniferus, the evergreen toad, from Central and South America
- Incilius melanochlorus, the dark green toad, from southern Central America

== See also ==
- Green frog (disambiguation)
