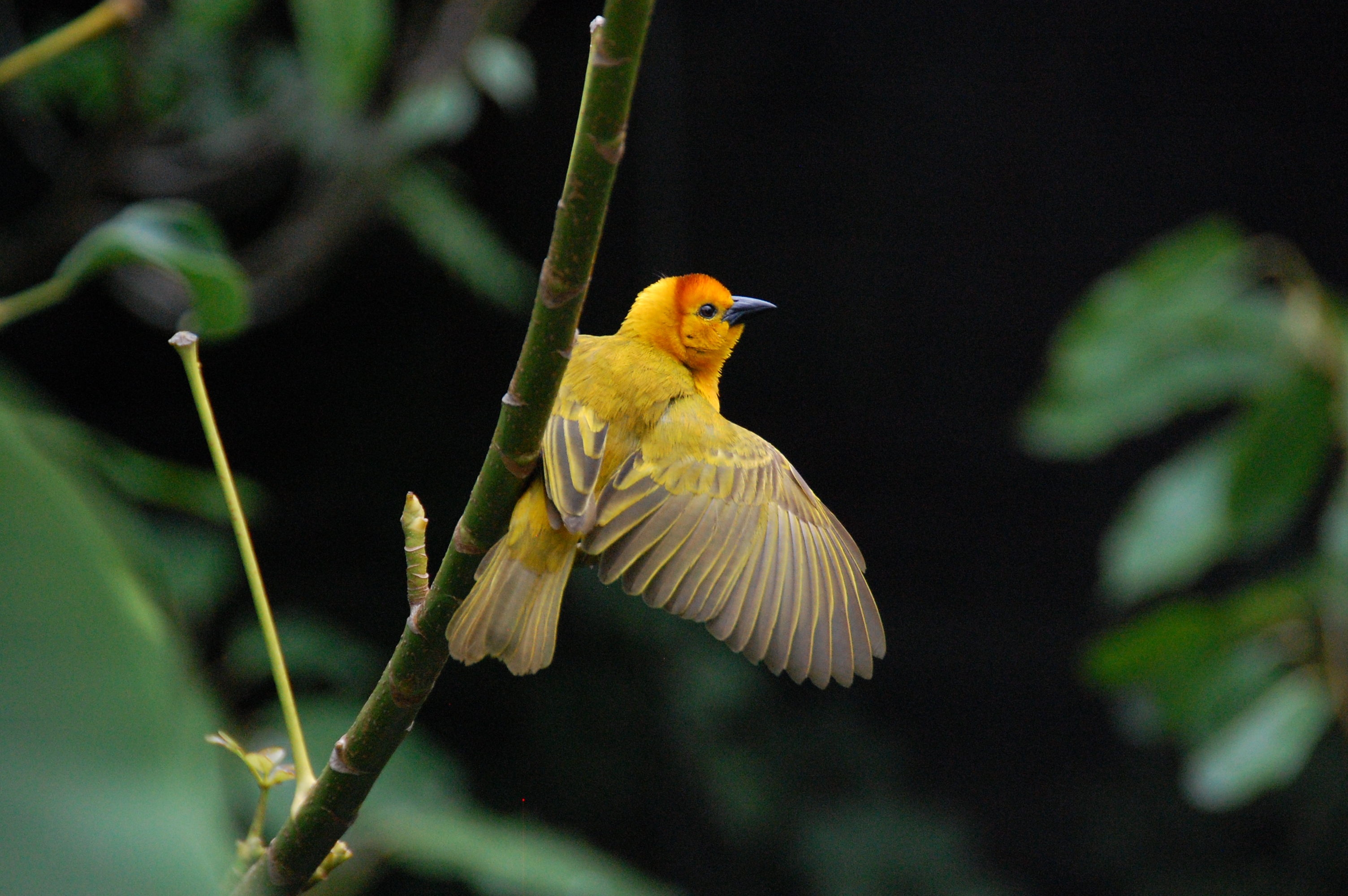
- A Taveta weaver at San Diego Zoo

Conservation status
- Least Concern (IUCN 3.1)

Scientific classification
- Kingdom: Animalia
- Phylum: Chordata
- Class: Aves
- Order: Passeriformes
- Family: Ploceidae
- Genus: Ploceus
- Species: P. castaneiceps

Binomial name
- Ploceus castaneiceps (Sharpe, 1890)

Synonyms
- Hyphantornis castaneiceps Sharpe, 1890

= Taveta weaver =

Species of bird

The Taveta weaver (Ploceus castaneiceps), also known as the Taveta golden weaver, (or the mango bird) is a species of bird in the weaver family, Ploceidae. It is found on the African savannah in Kenya and Tanzania. The name of the bird refers to the region of Taveta in southeastern Kenya near the border with Tanzania where it occurs, as well as how these birds weave intricate nests.

== Description ==
The male Taveta weaver is a vibrant golden yellow color; this color is duller on its back. The wings and tail are a greener color, whereas brown spots are located on the chest. The back of the head is red, and the bill, or beak, is black. The female is an olive color with paler streaks. In general, the Taveta weaver is a small bird, around the size of the finch and closely related to the sparrow.

=== Vocalizations ===
Even though they are considered songbirds, the sounds that the bird makes are not pleasing to past human observers. Weavers often make a unique—often described as "weird"—noise to communicate.

== Distribution and habitat ==
This bird is native to savannah of north-eastern Tanzania and south-eastern Kenya. It prefers to live in bulrushes, woodland, and swampy areas. Some sightings of this bird have also been recorded in Asia.

== Behaviour and ecology ==
These birds live in large groups, or colonies.

=== Breeding ===
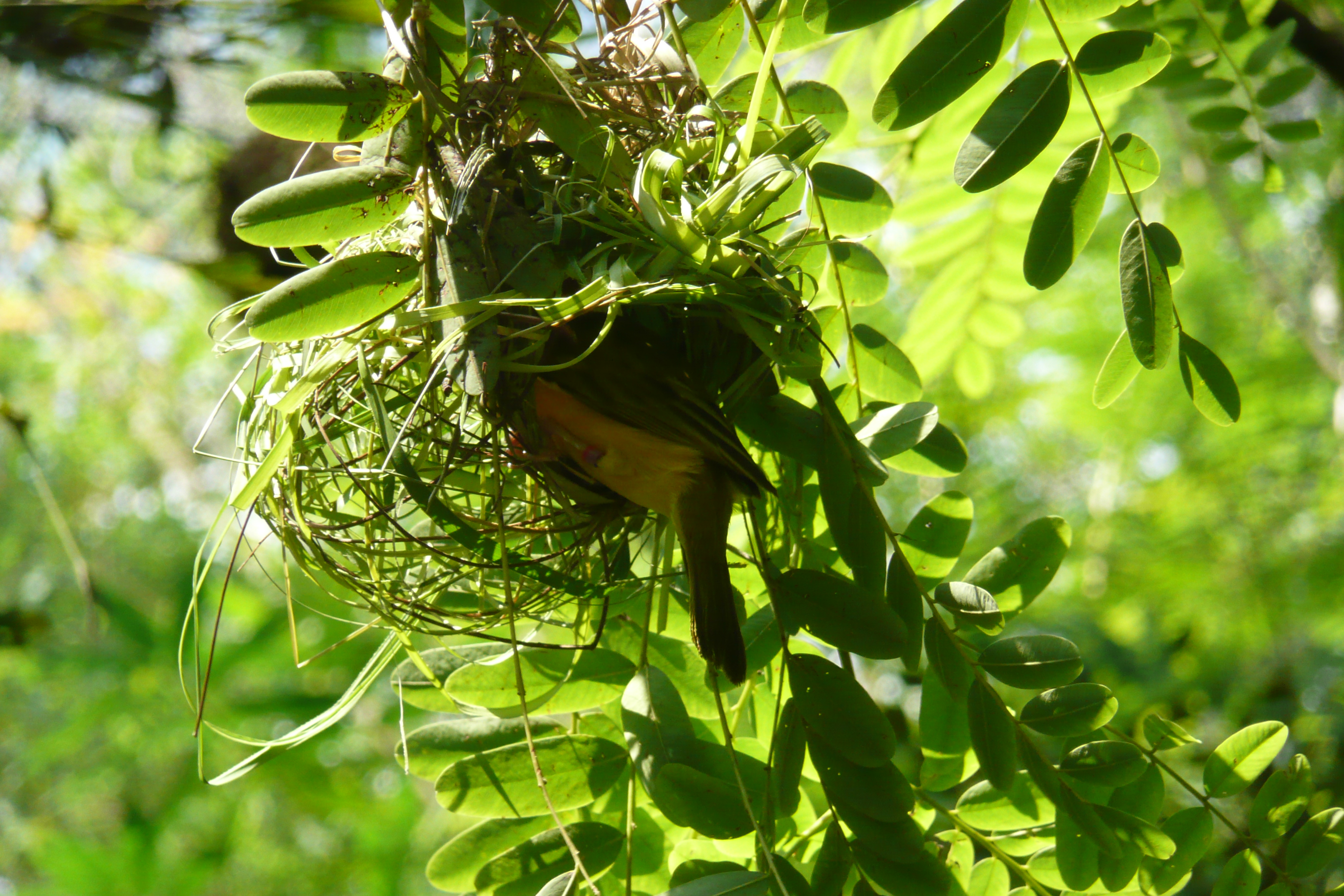
A golden weaver weaving an orb-shaped nest

Male weavers build extravagant oval nests over water attached to stems of reeds or grasses. The Taveta weavers lay two or three glossy, dark, olive-green eggs. The female bird chooses who she will mate, depending on how impressed she is with a male's skill to construct a nest.

=== Feeding ===
The Taveta weaver eats mostly seeds, though they have been seen to feed from small insects. The offspring receive food from the mother. This bird also feeds on corn and grasses.

=== Special adaptations ===
The Taveta weaver has strong claws and bills which enable the bird to weave complex nests. Nests can sometimes fill an entire tree; the weaver usually breeds within the colonies.

== Status ==
The Taveta weaver is currently not endangered.
