= Abronia taeniata =

Conservation status
- Vulnerable (IUCN 3.1)
- CITES Appendix II

Scientific classification
- Kingdom: Animalia
- Phylum: Chordata
- Class: Reptilia
- Order: Squamata
- Suborder: Anguimorpha
- Family: Anguidae
- Genus: Abronia
- Species: A. taeniata

Binomial name
- Abronia taeniata Wiegmann, 1828
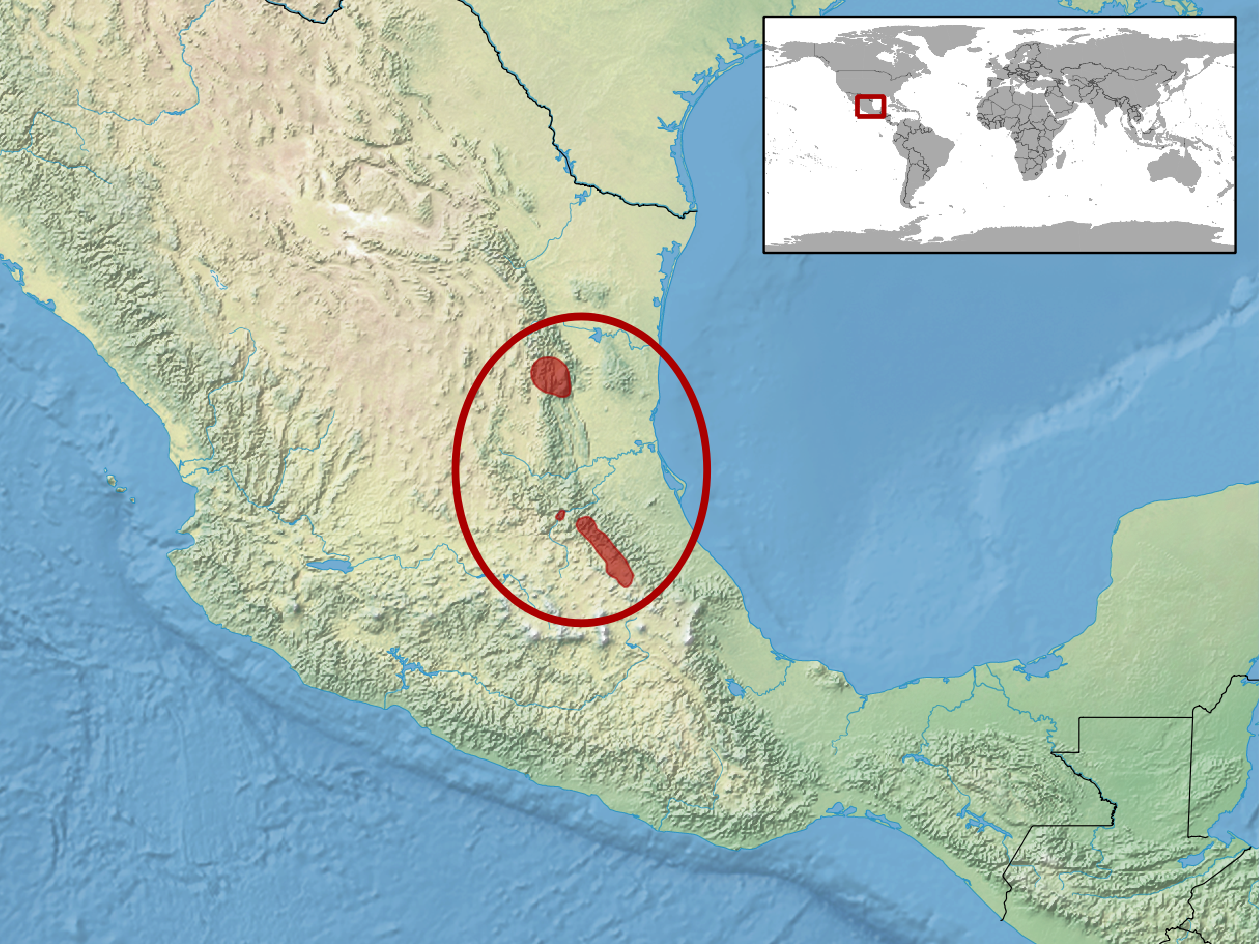

Species of lizard

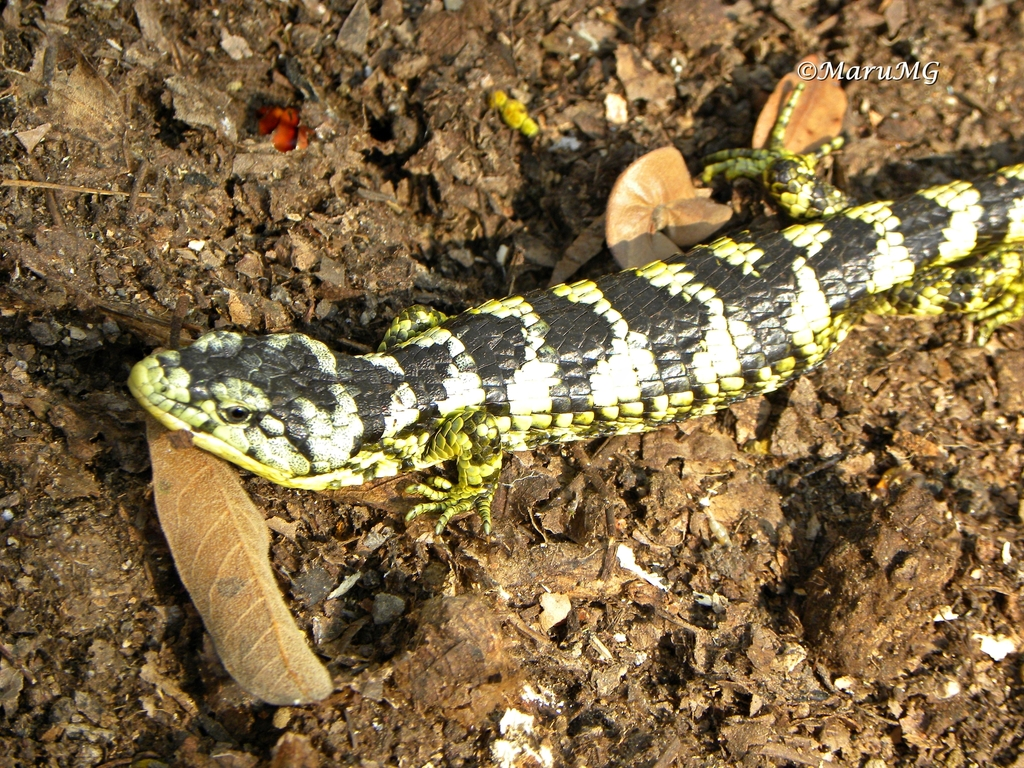
Abronia taeniata

Abronia taeniata, the banded arboreal alligator lizard or bromeliad arboreal alligator lizard, is a vulnerable species of arboreal alligator lizard described in 1828 by Arend Friedrich August Wiegmann.

Abronia taeniata is eurythermic. It can sustain activity at a wide range of temperatures and actively avoids favorable microhabitats in the spring and is a moderate thermoregulator during autumn and winter.

== Reproduction ==
Males reached sexual maturity at a smaller SVL (snout-vent length) than females. The same pattern emerged with body mass and both males and females had similar weights.

In males, testicular volume varied with the month; smaller in November, increases in December through January, a plateau from April to August and after a peak in September and October there was a patterned decline in November. Testicular increase correlated with mean monthly precipitation, but not temperature or photoperiod.

Litter size was not correlated with female SVL (snout-vent length).
