= Laura Brodie =

Staff herpetologist

Laura Brodie (July 7, 1908 – 2004) was a staff herpetologist at the Chicago Natural History Museum (now the Field Museum of Natural History).

== Early life and education ==
Laura Brodie was born at Rockwood Farm, the family home of Furman Edward and Ida Johnson Brodie, located 5 miles southeast of Leesville, SC. Her parents were owners of Brodie Light & Power Co., which supplied electricity to Leesville, Gilbert, and Summit, SC. Laura Brodie's great grandfather was Confederate General Paul Quattlebaum.

When Brodie was twelve years old her father had scolded her for killing a harmless snake that was identified as a hognose snake. This led her to recognizing that not all snakes are venomous, this sparked her interest with snakes and reptiles. That knowledge sparked an interest in reptiles that led her to roam the woods and fields around the farm in search of the various kinds of snakes and lizards that inhabited the region.

While in high school she created a mini museum that she called the Rockwood Museum where she would display the reptiles she had caught. She maintained seventeen cages of reptiles and amphibians. She collected a deadly eastern coral snake at age 14 and caught a cottonmouth the following year.

Unable to properly identify all of her specimens, Brodie's mother took her to Columbia, SC to meet with professor Julian D. Corrington, a herpetologist in the biology department at the University of South Carolina.

Brodie graduated from Batesburg-Leesville High School and attended Winthrop College. Her biology professor recognized her interest in herpetology and encouraged her to work with Howard K. Gloyd at the University of Michigan Museum of Zoology.

== Career ==
Brodie got a job at the University of Michigan Museum of Zoology and continued studying under the direction of Alexander G. Ruthhven, a noted herpetologist. During her first year in Michigan, Brodie stayed with geneticist Frjeda Blanchard and her husband Frank N. Blanchard. The couple taught her techniques and procedures used by professional herpetologists. Brodie collected specimens from South Carolina for the University of Michigan's collection.

In 1946 Brodie joined the herpetology staff at the Chicago Natural History Museum (now the Field Museum). She collected specimens for the museum and assisted Karl P. Schmidt. She also collected specimens for other museums.

Brodie also worked tirelessly at the Chicago Natural History Museum to create a collection of labeled animal photos. Before her work the museum did not have a concise system in place and due to her belief that all photos of animals will be useful at some point, began the daunting task.

In 1956 Brodie was seriously injured in an automobile accident, which effectively ended her career.
