= Syracuse dish =

A Syracuse dish or Syracuse watch glass is a shallow, circular, flat-bottomed dish of thick glass. Usually, it is 67 mm in outer diameter and 52 mm in inner diameter.

== Background ==
Nathan Cobb, one of the pioneers of nematology in the United States, was the first who suggested using the syracuse dish for counting nematodes in 1918.

== Uses ==
It is used as laboratory equipment in biology for either storage or culturing.
