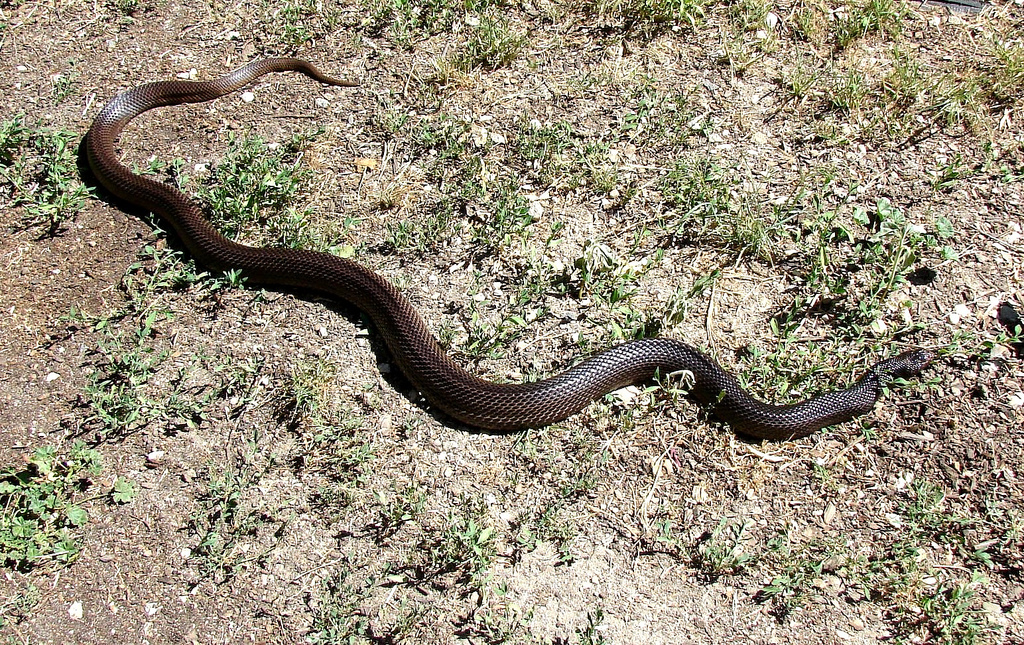

Conservation status
- Critically Imperiled (NatureServe)

- Threatened (ESA)

Scientific classification
- Kingdom: Animalia
- Phylum: Chordata
- Order: Squamata
- Suborder: Serpentes
- Family: Colubridae
- Genus: Pituophis
- Species: P. melanoleucus
- Subspecies: P. m. lodingi

Trinomial name
- Pituophis melanoleucus lodingi Blanchard, 1924

Synonyms
- Pituophis lodingi Blanchard, 1924; Pituophis melanoleucus loedingi Blanchard, 1924

= Pituophis melanoleucus lodingi =

Black pinesnake

Subspecies of snake

Pituophis melanoleucus lodingi, commonly known as the black pinesnake or black pine snake, is a subspecies of nonvenomous snake in the family Colubridae. The species is endemic to southern Mississippi and southwestern Alabama. It is one of three subspecies of the species Pituophis melanoleucus.

== Naming and taxonomy ==
The black pinesnake's first appearance in literature was in 1920, when American herpetologist Frank N. Blanchard made a report of an exceptional specimen of Pituophis. He noted that, for the most part, it was black above and below. Later, in 1924, after the collection of a total of four separate individuals, Blanchard proposed the creation of a new species, "Pituophis lodingi ", and the name was subsequently used in literature. The classification as a subspecies first appeared in literature in 1932 and, following the 1932 publication, remained the chosen classification As of 2025, the snake remains classified at the subspecies level by the Integrated Taxonomic Information System. Additionally, scientific literature published as recently as November 2024 continues to call the snake P. m. lodingi.

A synonym for the black pinesnake is P. lodingi, the original name by Blanchard; however, P. lodingi is invalid taxonomically. The name Pituophis lodingi (and thus its current name, Pituophis melanoleucus lodingi) originates from the discoverer of the exceptional specimen noted above: it was given to Blanchard by, and thus named after, Henry Peter Löding, who was an amateur naturalist in Mobile, Alabama.

As of 2025, the black pinesnake is geographically isolated from other pinesnakes (pinesnake is a term for P. melanoleucus as a whole). However, an intermediate form between the black pinesnake and P. m. mugitus (the Florida pinesnake) was described in 1956 which occasionally showed characteristics of both subspecies, demonstrating that, in the past, contact occurred. Separately, a 1971 study suggests that while intergradation occurred in the past between the black pinesnake and P. ruthveni (the Louisiana pinesnake), it likely does not continue to occur.

== Description ==
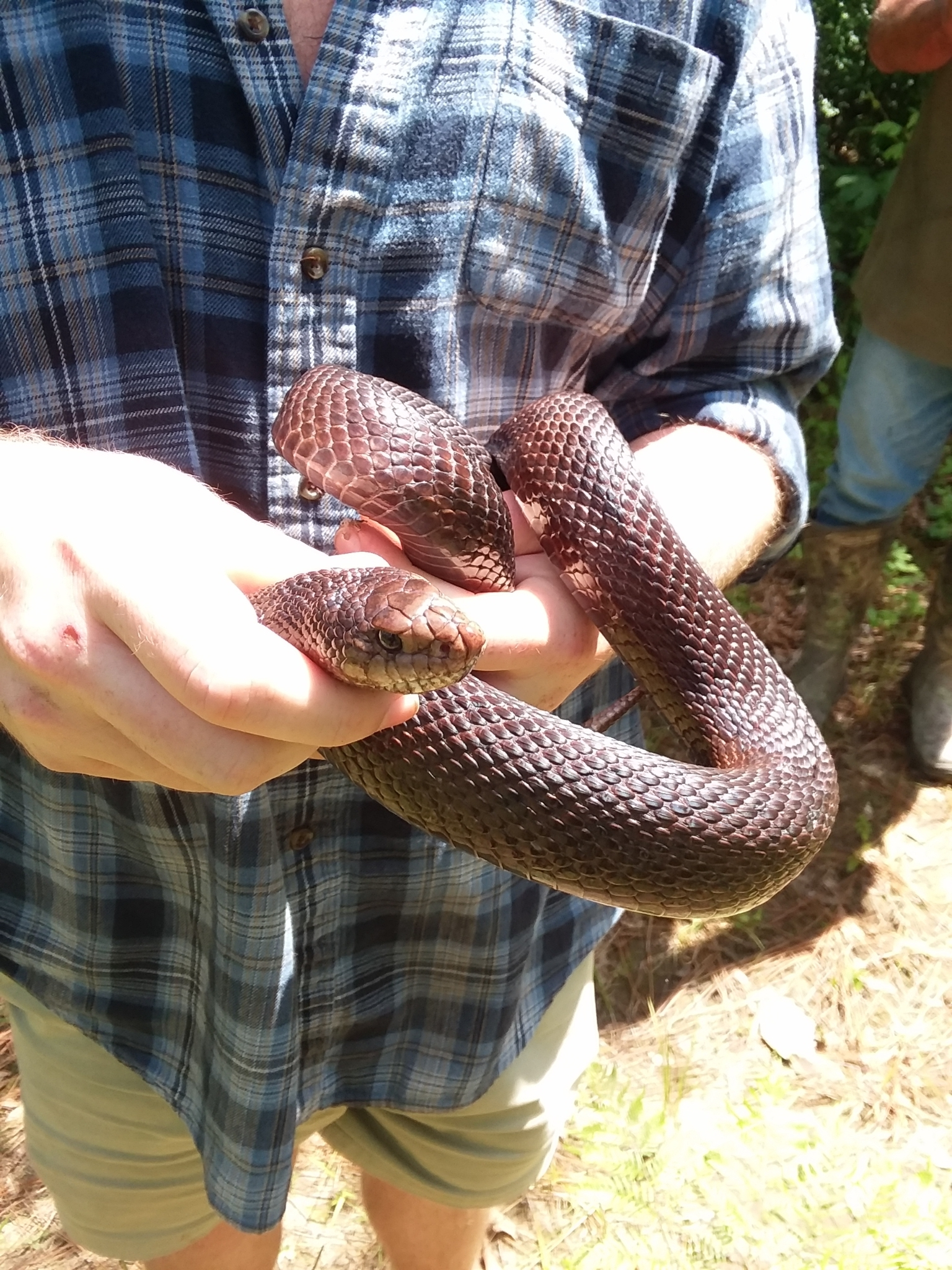
A russet colored black pinesnake

Pinesnakes as a whole have keeled dorsal scales and a pointed snout. Both pinesnakes and the black pinesnake display a blotched pattern that darkens with age. However, the black pinesnake can be differentiated from other pinesnakes by its dark brown to black upper (dorsal) and lower (ventral) surfaces. Adults may possess russet-brown on the snout and lips, and occasional white scales on the throat and belly may be present. Finally, there may be faint blotches present on the posterior portion of the body, reaching to the tail. The black pinesnake can be differentiated from racers and whipsnakes by its keeled dorsal scales and singular anal scale (versus the other snakes' smooth dorsal scales and divided anal scale).

Adult black pinesnakes usually have a total length (tail included) of 48 to 64 in (1.2 to 1.6 m), though the longest recorded was 89 in (2.3 m).

== Distribution and habitat ==
The black pinesnake is native to certain southeastern states in the United States. Specifically, its range is limited to the following states:

- Louisiana, status S1 (Note: Status S1 means "critically imperiled" or at high risk of extirpation (local extinction) in the jurisdiction.) (though it has likely been extirpated)
- Alabama, status S2 (Note: Status S2 means "imperiled" or at high risk of extirpation (local extinction) in the jurisdiction.) (limited to southern Alabama)
- Mississippi, status S2

Within these areas, the black pinesnake inhabits longleaf pine habitats. The optimal habitat consists of "sandy, well-drained soils with an open-canopied overstory of longleaf pine, a reduced shrub layer, and a dense herbaceous ground cover".

== Ecology ==
The black pinesnake is primarily diurnal, with some activity during the night. It is carnivorous and potentially uses its burrowing skills to dig nests or excavate rodents for consumption. Its diet primarily consists of rodents such as hispid cotton rats, mice, and, more rarely, eastern fox squirrels, but also includes nestling rabbits, bobwhite quail and their eggs, and eastern kingbirds.

In a 2007 study involving five individual black pinesnakes, they were found hibernating only in "chambers formed by the decay and burning of pine stumps and roots" at a mean depth of 9.8 in (25 cm) and a maximum depth of 13.8 in (35 cm). In the same study, it was found that, unlike the northern pinesnake (P. m. melanoleucus), the only excavation of hibernacula (places where animals seek refuge to overwinter) completed by the black pinesnake was minor enlargement of preexisting chambers. It was noted separately, however, that "[t]hese sites are not considered true hibernacula because black pinesnakes move above ground on warm days throughout all months of the year".

== Conservation status ==
In addition to the state-level conservation statuses previously noted, the black pinesnake has been classified by NatureServe as G4T1?; this means that while the species, P. melanoleucus, is "apparently secure", the specific subspecies of P. m. lodingi is "critically imperiled". NatureServe defines "apparently secure" as "[a]t fairly low risk of extinction or collapse" and "vulnerable" as "[a]t very high risk of extinction or collapse". However, the question mark indicates inexact numeric rank with regard to the subspecies conservation status. Separately, the U.S. Fish and Wildlife Service (USFWS) has designated the black pinesnake as "Threatened" since 2015.

The subspecies P. m. lodingi is threatened primarily due to habitat loss, though it is also affected by snake fungal disease and intentional killing by humans. In the original rule by the USFWS, it was determined that, in addition to the previously listed factors, the black pinesnake is threatened by degradation and fragmentation of habitat due to silviculture, urbanization, fire suppression, and road mortality. Fragmentation of these habitats leads to genetic drift. Habitat loss, in the case of the black pinesnake, is primarily due to conversion of habitat to incompatible uses, like commercial forestry, agriculture, and urban development, though climate change also plays a factor in reducing available habitat.
