= Helen Thompson Gaige =

American zoologist

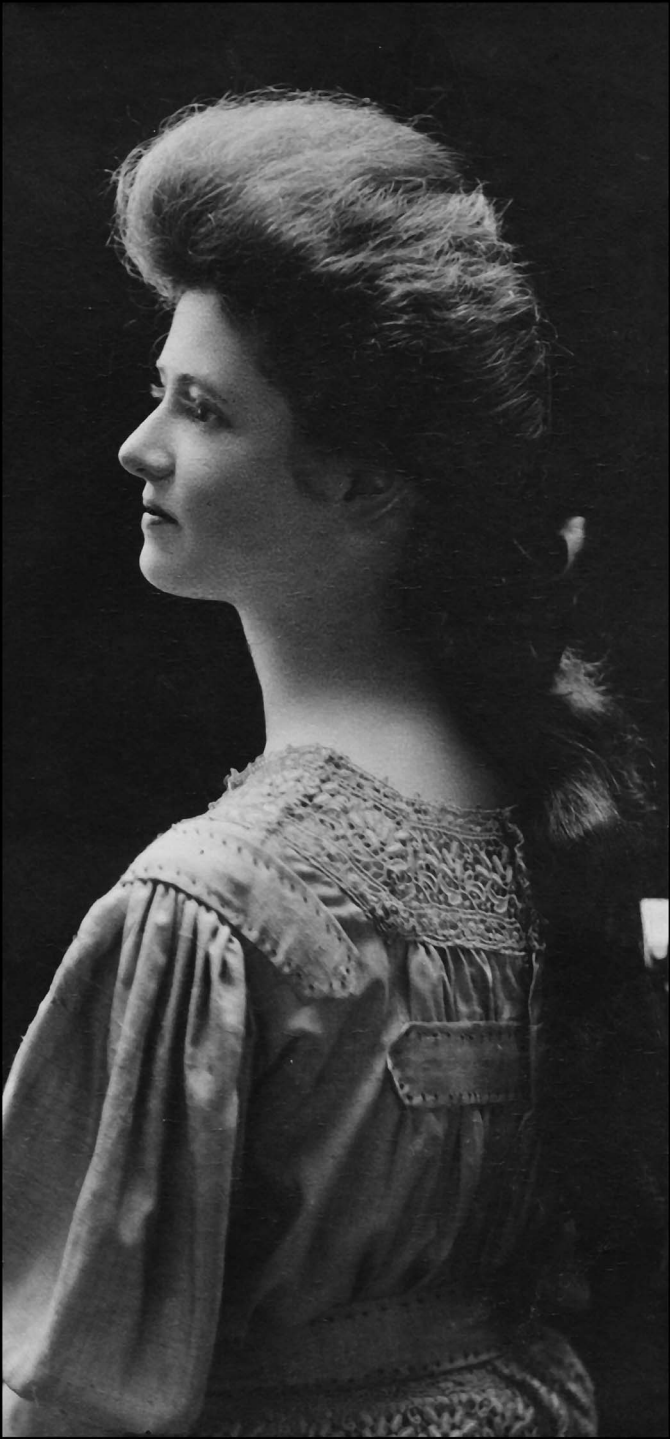
- Helen Thompson Gaige in 1913
- Born: November 24, 1890; Bad Axe, Michigan
- Died: October 24, 1976 (aged 85)
- Education: University of Michigan
- Occupation: herpetologist
- Employer: Museum of Zoology at the University of Michigan
- Spouse: Frederick McMahon Gaige

Helen Beulah Thompson Gaige (November 24, 1890 – October 24, 1976) was an American herpetologist, curator of Reptiles and Amphibians for the Museum of Zoology at the University of Michigan, and a specialist in neotropical frogs.

Gaige was born in Bad Axe, Michigan, and studied at the University of Michigan with Frank Nelson Blanchard, under professor Alexander Grant Ruthven. From 1910 until 1923 she was an assistant curator of reptiles and amphibians for the Museum of Zoology at the University of Michigan. In 1923 she became curator of amphibians. In 1928, she co-authored The Herpetology of Michigan with Ruthven. In 1937 she became editor in chief of the ichthyological and herpetological periodical Copeia, and wrote extensively on Central American amphibians and reptiles. Her research chiefly concerned the geographical distribution, habitats, and life histories of amphibians. In 1917 she discovered the salamander genus Rhyacotriton, which would later be divided into four distinct species. She also assisted in organizing the American Society of Ichthyologists and Herpetologists, of which she was named honorary president in 1946. She is further honored by having several species and subspecies of reptiles named after her, including Atractus gaigeae, Dipsas gaigeae, Epicrates cenchria gaigeae, Lepidophyma gaigeae, Plestiodon multivirgatus gaigeae, Podarcis gaigeae, Pristimantis gaigei, Rhadinaea gaigeae, Sceloporus lundelli gaigeae, Sphaerodactylus gaigeae, Sphenomorphus helenae, and Trachemys gaigeae. The latter she collected the first specimen of on a trip to the Big Bend region of Texas in 1928.

She was married to entomologist Frederick McMahon Gaige. In honor of the couple, the American Society of Ichthyologists and Herpetologists presents its annual Gaige Fund Award, a monetary grant to help a graduate student in the field of herpetology. She died in Gainesville, Florida.

== Sources ==
- Biographies of People Honored in the Herpetological Nomenclature North America
- University of Michigan: Helen Beulah Thompson Gaige bibliography
- ASIH Gaige Fund Award
- Marilyn Ogilvie & Joy Harvey, The Biographical Dictionary of Women in Science: Pioneering Livers from Ancient Times to the Mid-20th Century
