= Nematology (journal) =

- Discipline: Nematology
- Language: English
- Edited by: David Hunt, Roland Perry

Publication details
- Former names: Revue de Nématologie, Fundamental and Applied Nematology
- History: 1999-present
- Publisher: Brill Publishers
- Frequency: 8/year
- Impact factor: 1.442 (2020)

Standard abbreviations
- ISO 4: Nematology

Indexing
- CODEN: NMATFJ
- ISSN: 1388-5545 (print); 1568-5411 (web)
- LCCN: sn99023272
- OCLC no.: 456621842

Links
- Journal homepage; Online access

Nematology is a peer-reviewed scientific journal covering the study of nematodes.

In 1978, French zoologist Michel Luc established the Revue de Nématologie (soon renamed Fundamental and Applied Nematology) that fused with Nematologica in 1999 to become Nematology. The editors-in-chief are David Hunt (CABI Europe) and Roland Perry (Rothamsted Research).
