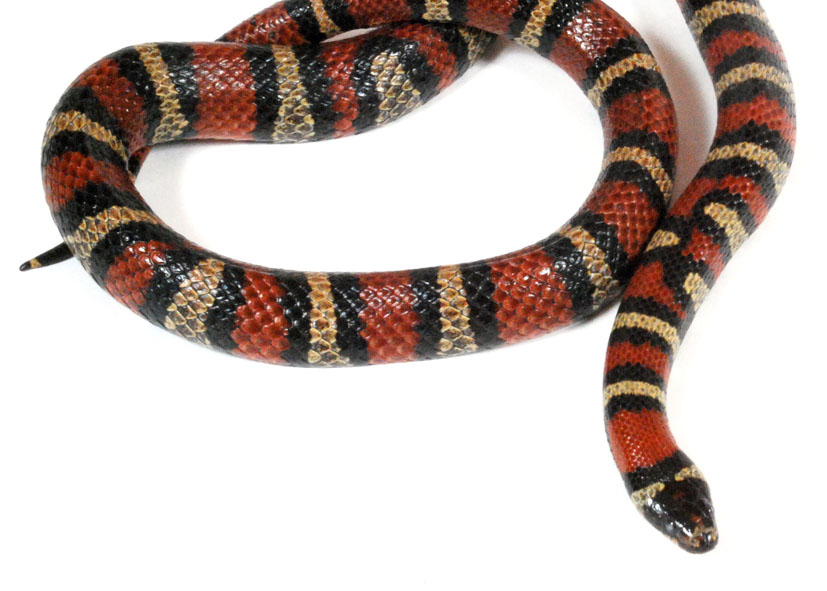

Conservation status
- Near Threatened (IUCN 3.1)

Scientific classification
- Kingdom: Animalia
- Phylum: Chordata
- Class: Reptilia
- Order: Squamata
- Suborder: Serpentes
- Family: Colubridae
- Genus: Lampropeltis
- Species: L. ruthveni

Binomial name
- Lampropeltis ruthveni Blanchard, 1920

= Lampropeltis ruthveni =

Species of snake

Lampropeltis ruthveni (common name: Ruthven's kingsnake) is a species of kingsnake in the family Colubridae. The species was described by Frank N. Blanchard in 1920 and named after American herpetologist Alexander Grant Ruthven. It is endemic to Mexico.

== Description ==
Unlike many of the other Mexican kingsnakes,L. ruthveni has a fairly consistent coloration, consisting of white stripes on red, bordered by black. The red is always very vivid, and the black banding is relatively thick compared to that of the other Mexican kingsnakes. The body can be up to 127 cm long and has a ventral scale count of 182-195 ventral scales. The head is distinct from the neck, and the eyes are distinct from the head, with the eyes having a golden-brown coloration.

== Distribution and habitat ==
L. ruthveni is found in the Mexican states of Guanajuato, Hidalgo, Jalisco, Michoacán, and Querétaro. It occurs in pine-oak forest and Mesquite grassland, in both semi-humid and arid environments. The species is also known to be plentiful in rocky areas adjacent to crop fields. Elevation ranges from 1,925m to 2,667m.

== Diet ==
In the wild, L. ruthveni is known to predate on rodents, lizards, and other snakes.

== Reproduction ==
L. ruthveni is oviparous, typically laying 6-10 eggs in a clutch.

== Conservation ==
It is a common species but its abundance is decreasing. It is collected for the international pet trade (sometimes illegally), and also habitat loss (deforestation) is a threat. Its preference for steep rocky hillsides is believed to protect some populations from encroaching agriculture, but the range as a whole is extremely fragmented.

== Captivity ==
L. ruthveni has a fairly stable captive population, with little collection from wild snakes. The albino morph is especially popular amongst captive breeders.
