= Citrus root-knot nematode =

Citrus root-knot nematode may refer to:

- Tylenchulus semipenetrans
- Meloidogyne citri
- Meloidogyne fujianensis
- Meloidogyne indica
- Meloidogyne jianyangensis
- Meloidogyne kongi
- Meloidogyne mingnanica
