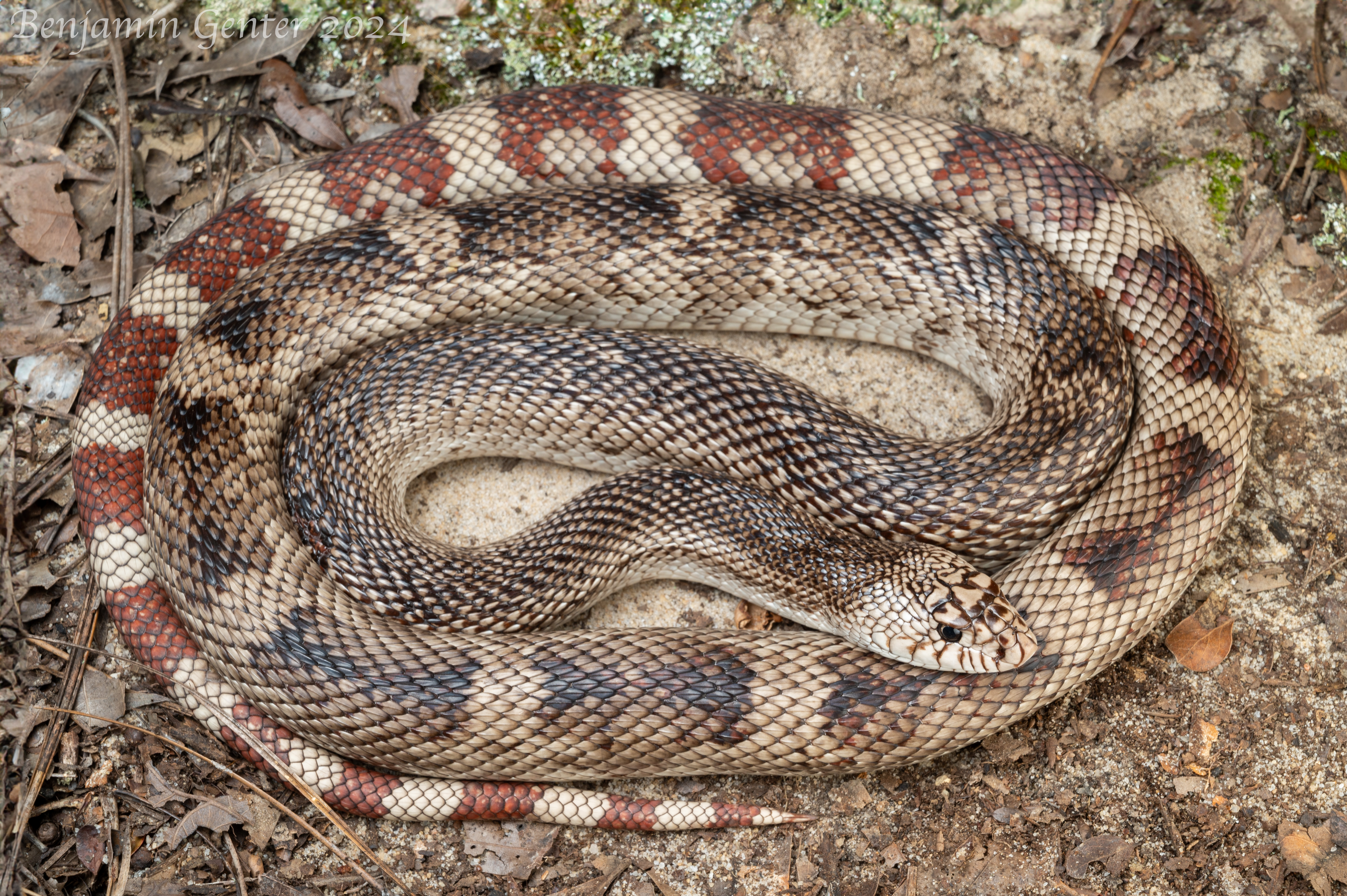

Conservation status
- Least Concern (IUCN 3.1)

Scientific classification
- Kingdom: Animalia
- Phylum: Chordata
- Class: Reptilia
- Order: Squamata
- Suborder: Serpentes
- Family: Colubridae
- Genus: Pituophis
- Species: P. melanoleucus

Binomial name
- Pituophis melanoleucus (Daudin, 1803)
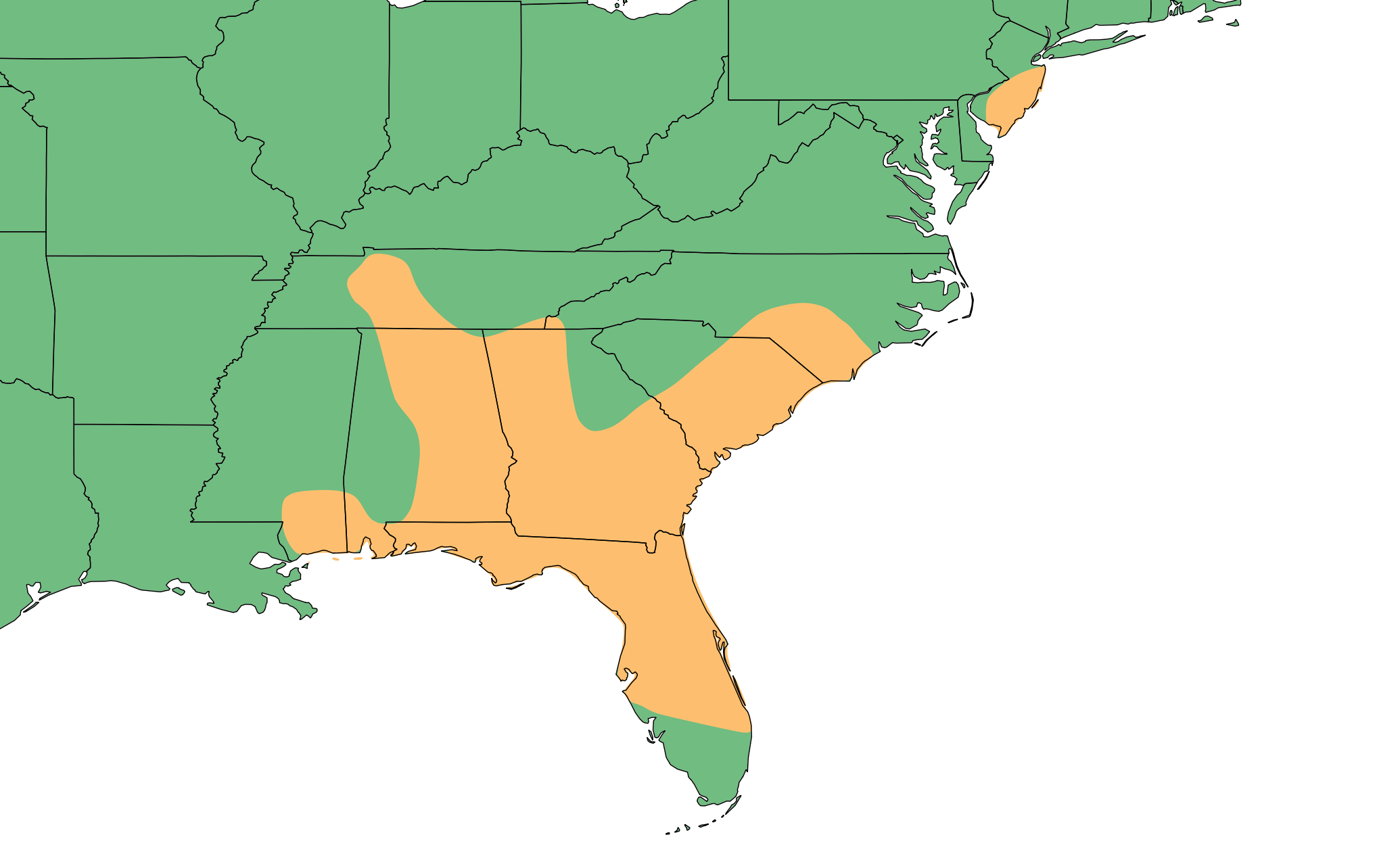

Synonyms
- List: Coluber melanoleucus Daudin, 1803; Pituophis melanoleucus Holbrook, 1842; Churchilla bellona Baird & Girard, 1852; Pituophis bellona Baird & Girard, 1852; Pituophis melanoleucus Baird & Girard, 1853; Rhinechis melanoleucus A.M.C. Duméril, 1853; Pityophis melanoleucus Garman, 1884; Coluber melanoleucus Boulenger, 1894; Pituophis melanoleucus Stejneger & Barbour, 1917

= Pituophis melanoleucus =

Species of snake

Pituophis melanoleucus, commonly known as the eastern pine snake, is a species of nonvenomous snake in the family Colubridae. The species is native to the southeastern United States. Three subspecies are traditionally recognized as being valid, though taxonomic changes may be occurring.

== Taxonomy and etymology ==
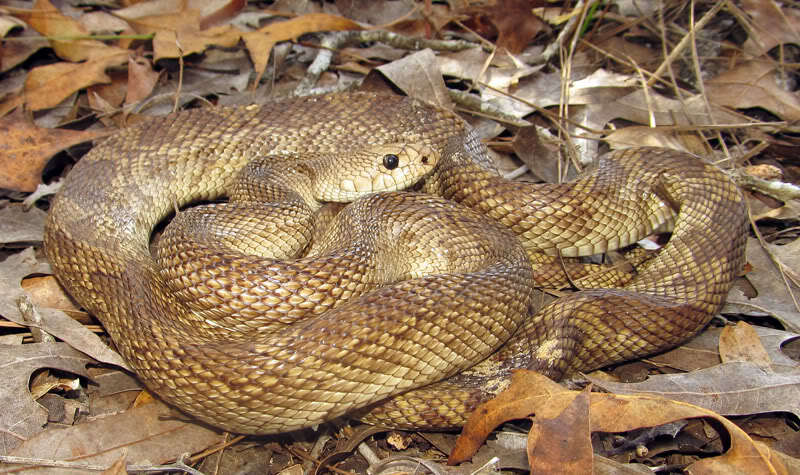
P. m. mugitus, Florida pine snake

The pine snake, Pituophis melanoleucus, gets its specific name from the Latin roots melano- meaning black and leucus meaning white. This is in reference to its black-and-white body. Following an influential study that occurred in 2000, three subspecies of Pituophis melanoleucus have been recognized:

- Nominate subspecies P. m. melanoleucus (Daudin, 1803), the northern pine snake;
- P. m. lodingi Blanchard, 1924, the black pine snake; and
- P. m. mugitus Barbour, 1921, the Florida pine snake.

The subspecific name lodingi is in honor of Danish-born amateur herpetologist Peder Henry Löding (1869–1942), who lived in Alabama.

The species has a variety of common names, including: pine snake, pinesnake, common pine snake, bullsnake, black and white snake, carpet snake, chicken snake, common bullsnake, eastern bullsnake, eastern pine snake, horn(ed) snake, New Jersey pine snake, North American pine snake, northern pine snake, pilot snake, and white gopher snake.

=== Taxonomic challenges ===
By the nature of the field, taxonomists — those who study taxonomy — often disagree on specific classifications of species. These disagreements extend to Pituophis melanoleucus, whose taxonomic status - specifically, the differentiation of three subspecies - has been challenged. One proponent of a taxonomic revision to eliminate the subspecies classifications is the Society for the Study of Amphibians and Reptiles, whose list of amphibians and reptiles was updated in the 9th edition to eliminate the subspecies distinction following a 2021 study "that showed P. melanoleucus to consist of continuous populations that did not correspond to previously recognized subspecies." Another review of scientific literature found that two genomic analyses in 2022 and 2023 showed that "subspecific taxonomy does not reflect the evolutionary history of the species." While this could suggest that the taxonomical classification of Pituophis melanoleucus is changing or will imminently change, the subspecies classification developed in 2000 was used in scientific literature as recently as May 2025.

== Description ==
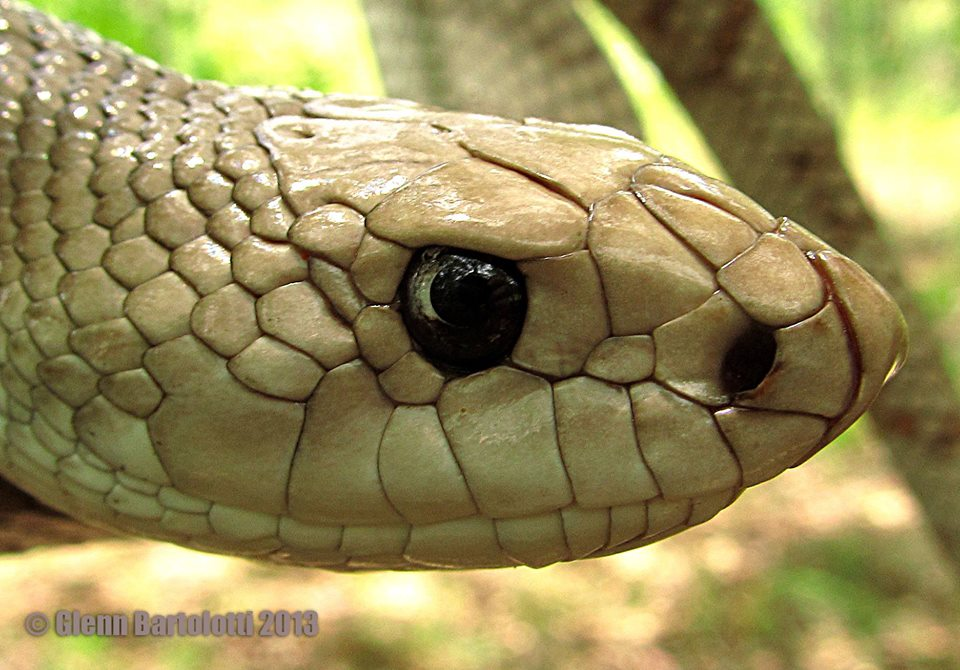
Florida pine snake, close-up of the head

Adults of Pituophis melanoleucus are large, growing to 48–90 in (120–230 cm) in total length (tail included) and are powerfully built. The head is small and somewhat pointed with an enlarged rostral scale that extends upward between the internasal scales. Usually, four prefrontal scales are seen. At midbody are 27–37 rows of keeled dorsal scales. The anal plate is single. The color pattern consists of a light ground color overlaid with black, brown, or reddish-brown blotches.

== Geographic range and habitat ==
The species Pituophis melanoleucus is found in the United States in Alabama, Florida, Georgia, Kentucky, Louisiana, Mississippi, New Jersey, North Carolina, South Carolina, Tennessee, Delaware and Virginia. The nominate subspecies occurs in southern New Jersey, southern North Carolina west through South Carolina to northern Georgia, eastern Tennessee, southeastern Kentucky and south into Alabama. P. m. lodingi occurs from southwestern Alabama to eastern Louisiana, overlapping with P. m. mugitus from southern South Carolina to Georgia and southern Florida.

The pine snake inhabits pine flatwoods, sandy pine-oak woodlands, prairies, cultivated field, open brushland, rocky desert and chaparral. It occurs from sea level to an elevation of 9,000 ft (2,700 m). The pine snake requires well-drained, sandy soils with little vegetation for use as nesting and hibernation sites. Often select habitat that undergoes frequent fire. P. melanoleucus communities in New Jersey were found to hibernate communally while communities in other regions like Tennessee were found to hibernate on their own.

== Ecology ==
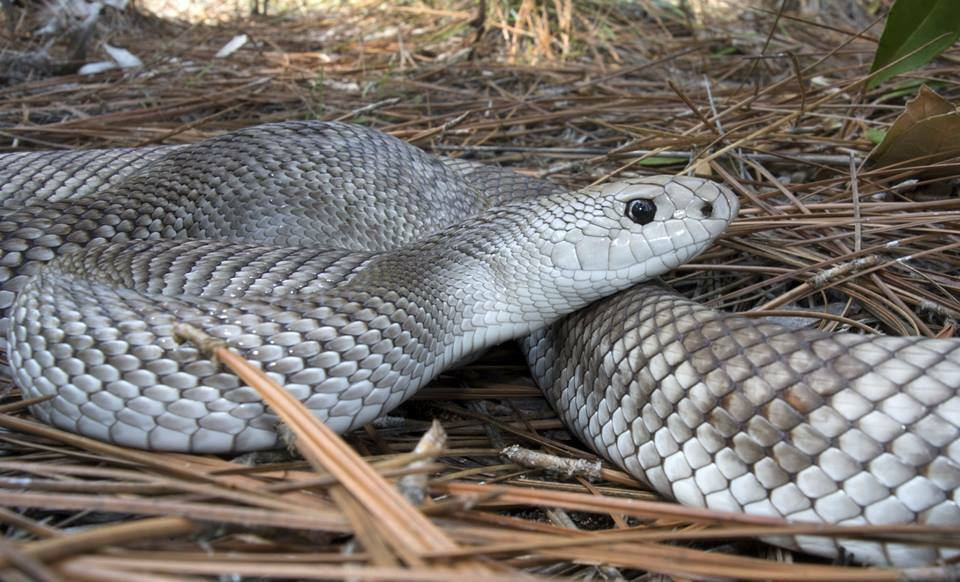
Florida pine snake with a light pattern

The pine snake preys on rats, mice, moles and other small mammals and eggs. It often enters rodent burrows in search of a meal. In these cases, multiple kills are frequent, with the snake pressing the mice against the walls of the burrow. The snake remains underground in cold weather or during the heat of summer days.

When disturbed, it often hisses loudly, sometimes flattening its head, vibrating its tail, and eventually striking at an intruder. To make the hissing sound, the snake forces air out of its lungs, vibrating the epiglottis. Several mammal species have been known to predate upon the hibernacula and nesting burrows of pine snakes including the American red fox (Vulpes fulva), striped skunk (Mephitis mephitis) and Northern short-tailed shrew (Blarina brevicauda).

=== Reproduction ===
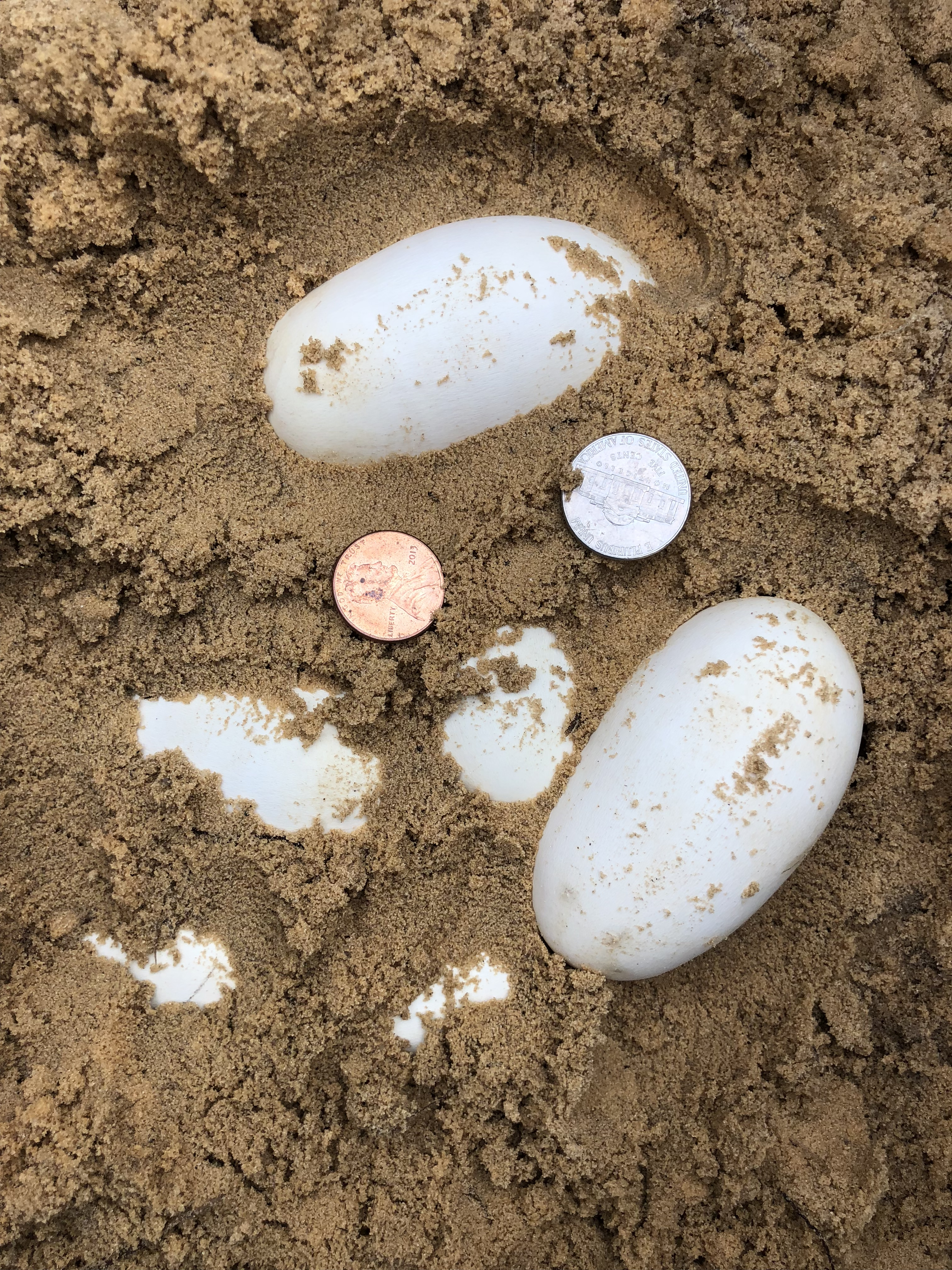
Southern pine snake eggs

After mating has taken place in spring, clutches of three to 24 eggs are laid in June–August. The snakes excavate nests themselves in sandy burrows or under large rocks or logs and hatch after 64–79 days of incubation. They are generally known to have no problem nesting near urbanization. The optimal temperature for incubation is 26-28 °C, with adverse effects, such as morphological abnormalities, occurring outside of this optimal range. They are known to build communal nests, with several females laying eggs in the same spot. Tend to make nests in clearings with minimal tree cover to eliminate digging obstacles.in sandy burrows or under large rocks or logs and hatch after 64–79 days of incubation.The eggs are adherent and quite large, up to 66 mm (2.6 in) long by 45 mm (1.8 in) wide. Hatchlings measure 33–45 cm (13–18 in). Eggs laid on wetter substrate tended to produce larger hatchlings than those laid on dryer substrate.

== Conservation status ==
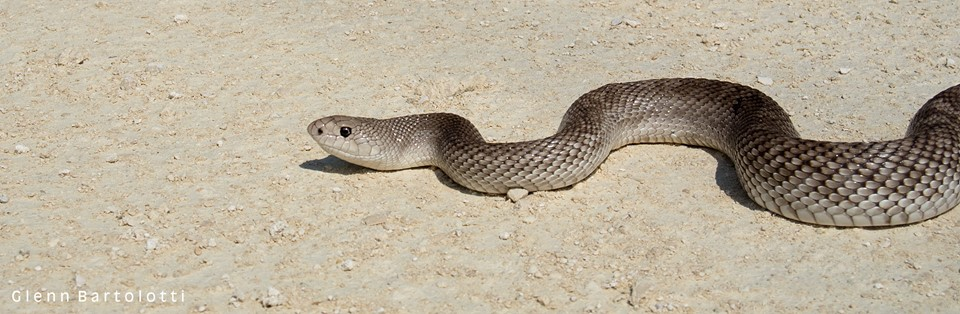
Florida pine snake

The pine snake is classified as least concern on the IUCN Red List, due to its wide distribution and large number of subpopulations; while the total populations appears to be declining, this is likely happening at a slow rate. However, the species is thought to be impacted by continued habitat degradation and destruction. It is present in a variety of protected areas. Habitat loss is the major threat to populations of this species. Construction of hibernacula is an effective tool for enhancing the survival rates of the species.
