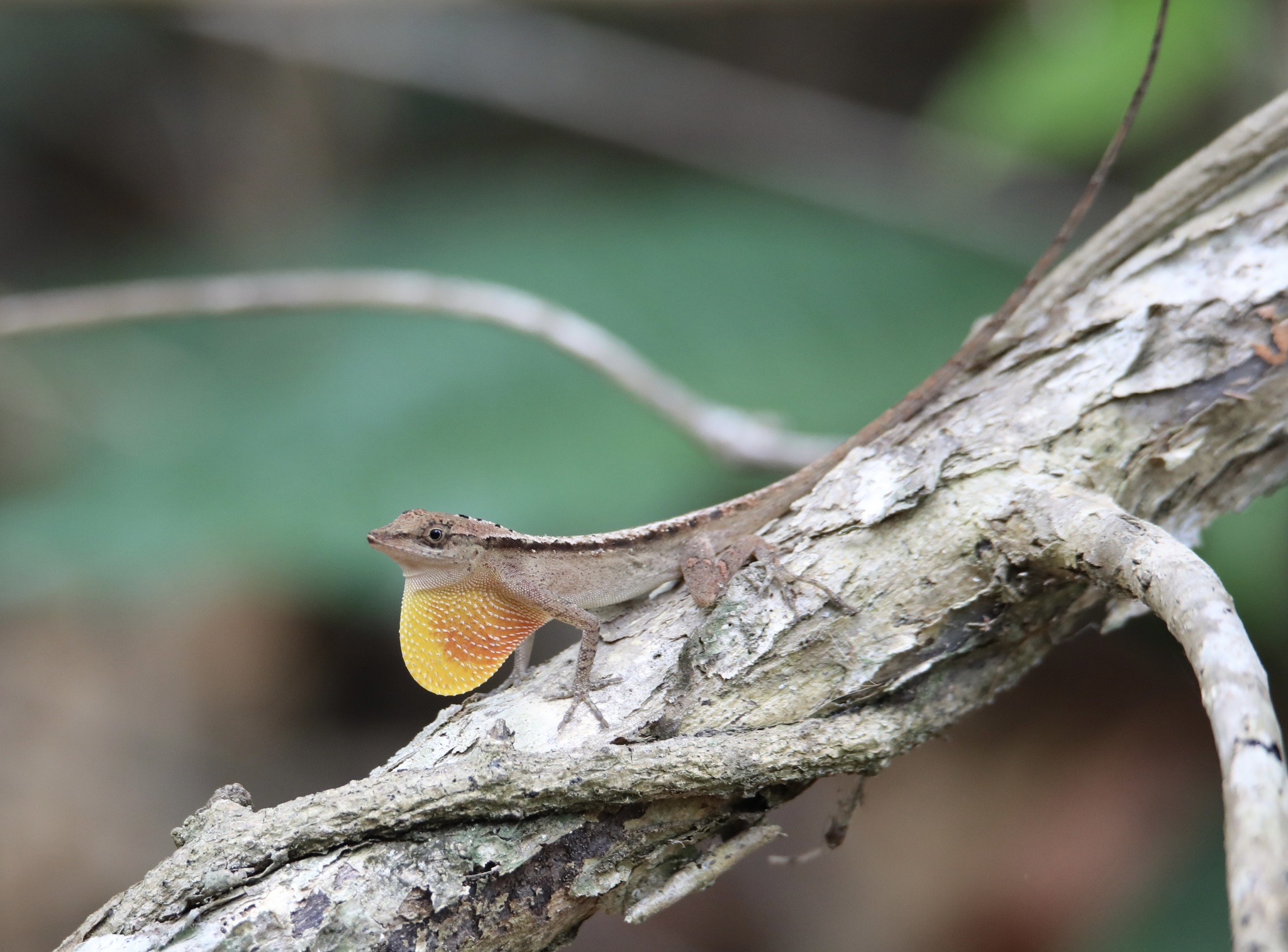

Scientific classification
- Kingdom: Animalia
- Phylum: Chordata
- Class: Reptilia
- Order: Squamata
- Suborder: Iguania
- Family: Dactyloidae
- Genus: Anolis
- Species: A. gaigei

Binomial name
- Anolis gaigei Ruthven, 1916

= Anolis gaigei =

Gaige's anole

Species of lizard

Anolis gaigei, commonly known as Gaige's anole, is a species of lizard in the family Dactyloidae. The species is found in Colombia and Panama.
