= Sphenomorphus helenae =

Conservation status
- Data Deficient (IUCN 3.1)

Scientific classification
- Kingdom: Animalia
- Phylum: Chordata
- Class: Reptilia
- Order: Squamata
- Family: Scincidae
- Genus: Sphenomorphus
- Species: S. helenae

Binomial name
- Sphenomorphus helenae Cochran, 1927

Synonyms
- Sphenomorphus helenae Cochran, 1927; Lygosoma helenae — M.A. Smith, 1935; Lygosoma (Sphenomorphus) helenae — M.A. Smith, 1937; Sphenomorphus helenae — Chen & Lue, 1987

Species of lizard

Sphenomorphus helenae, also known commonly as the Notaburi forest skink, is a species of lizard in the subfamily Sphenomorphinae of the family Scincidae. The species is endemic to Thailand.

== Etymology ==
The specific name, helenae, is in honor of American herpetologist Helen Beulah Thompson Gaige.

== Geographic range ==
S. helenae is known only from the type locality, "Nontaburi" (= Nonthaburi), which is in central Thailand.

== Habitat ==
The preferred natural habitat of S. helenae is unknown.

== Description ==
S. helenae is known only from the holotype, which has a snout-to-vent length (SVL) of 2.8 cm (1.1 in), and a partially regenerated tail 3.0 cm (1.2 in) long. According to British herpetologist Malcolm Arthur Smith, the holotype is an immature specimen.

== Reproduction ==
The mode of reproduction of S. helenae is unknown.
