= Frjeda Blanchard =

American geneticist

- Born: Frjeda Cobb; February 10, 1889; Sydney, Australia
- Died: August 29, 1977 (aged 88); Ann Arbor, Michigan
- Education: Radcliffe College; University of Illinois (BA); University of Michigan (PhD)
- Spouse: Frank N. Blanchard
- Father: Nathan Cobb
- Scientific career
- Fields: Genetics
- Institutions: University of Michigan

Frjeda Blanchard, née Cobb (October 2, 1889 – August 29, 1977), was an American plant and animal geneticist, the first to demonstrate Mendelian inheritance in reptiles.

== Life and work ==
Frjeda Blanchard was born on October 2, 1889, in Sydney, Australia, daughter of the plant pathologist and nematologist, Nathan Cobb. Her family returned to the United States in 1905, first living in Hawaii and then settling in Washington, D.C. Cobb's family helped him in his work and Frjeda aided her father in his laboratory. She went to Radcliffe College for three years before returning home to assist her father in his home laboratory and graduated from the University of Illinois at Urbana–Champaign with a B.S. degree in 1916. After helping her father with his nematode research later that year, Blanchard was offered a position with the University of Michigan's Matthaei Botanical Gardens by its director, Harley Harris Bartlett. She became assistant director three years later and received her Ph.D from the university in 1920, after researching Mendelian inheritance in strains of Oenothera (evening primrose). She married Frank N. Blanchard, a zoologist at the university, in 1922 and they had three children together.

Frieda won the Jeanne Cady Solis award in 1922 and again in 1926.

The couple collaborated researching garter snakes, Frank focused on life history, while Frjeda concentrated on genetics, being the first scientist to document Mendelian inheritance in reptiles. Frank died in 1937 but Frieda continued their research and raising their children. She died on August 29, 1977, in Ann Arbor, Michigan.

She is in the Blanchard family papers held at the Bentley Historical Archive at the University of Michigan.

=== Journal articles ===
- Frank N. Blanchard, M. Ruth Gilreath and Frieda Cobb Blanchard. The Eastern Ring-Neck Snake (Diadophis punctatus edwardsii) in Northern Michigan (Reptilia, Serpentes, Colubridae). Journal of Herpetology, Volume 13, Number 4 (November 15, 1979), pp. 377–402. DOI: 10.2307/1563473
