= Maynard Jack Ramsay =

American entomologist

Dr. Maynard Jack "Doc" Ramsay (November 22, 1914 – March 20, 2005) was an American entomologist noted for his efforts to track and eradicate exotic parasites carried in flowers, fruits and other cargoes arriving from overseas. He was listed in American Men of Science and Who's Who in America.

During his 36 years in government service, he often was called upon to provide his beetle expertise to the Smithsonian Institution and entomological organizations in the United States and elsewhere. He once provided entomological advice to writer John Steinbeck and found himself quoted on the subject of killer bees in the opening of Arthur Herzog's best-selling novel The Swarm.

== Work ==
Ramsay was widely known for his research on a potato cyst eelworm — the parasitic golden nematode (Globodera rostochiensis). The worm was discovered in 1941 in potato fields on Long Island, New York, the only state where it has established a foothold. Around 1946, the worm was found on a lily of the valley plants imported from the Netherlands. Ramsay helped trace the worm to infested flower fields in Germany that had been converted for potato cultivation during World War II. Inspectors from the Department of Agriculture began testing cargoes of lilies in Hamburg, which initially slowed the golden nematode's spread from across the Atlantic. The Golden Nematode Act was enacted on June 15, 1948, to combat the worm. As of 2003, the golden nematode is one of 22 federally regulated organisms in the United States. According to Society of Nematologists, "he played an instrumental role in reducing the spread of Globodera rostochiensis in the United States."

He also studied Dutch elm disease, termite infestations in Puerto Rico, and Mexican bean beetles in New York State, and helped develop methods for estimating losses from the parasites. He later trained inspectors from Japan, El Salvador, Jordan, and Indonesia in an effort to identify infested crops before they reached American shores. When those crops were found, agriculture officials usually ordered the cargoes dumped at sea and the ships fumigated. Raymond F. Bednar, a former director of the Animal and Plant Health Inspection Service (APHIS) in New York, recalled that Ramsay "always saw the new pest coming down the pike."

== Life ==
Ramsay was born and raised in Buffalo by his mother Lillian Maynard and father William "Dowie" Ramsay, a conductor and brakeman for the Nickel Plate Road. Ramsay studied under Albert R. Shadle and graduated from the University at Buffalo with a Bachelor of Science degree in Biology. Continuing his education at Cornell University, Ramsay graduated with a Master of Science degree in Mammalogy.

While living in Staten Island, Ramsay was awarded a Ph.D. in Entomology from Cornell in 1941, and gained employment with the U.S. Department of Agriculture. Ramsay was one of the first few Ph.D. holders in service to the Department, and thus, colleagues bestowed him with the nickname "Doc". Encouraged by Shadle, "Doc" Ramsay then married Alberta June Wentworth, a beautician and owner of Alberta's Beauty Shop, from Canisteo.

From 1950 to 1956, he served as a port entomologist, and then in 1967 was appointed to APHIS. He retired in 1977. Dr. Ramsay was also a former president of the Insecticide Society of Washington.

Alberta Ramsay died in 2003. Two years later, Maynard Ramsay died of pneumonia on March 20, 2005, in a Silver Spring nursing home. The couple resided in Bowie, Maryland.

== See also ==
- Entomology
- Nematology
