= Jeanne Cady Solis =

American neurologist (1867–1947)

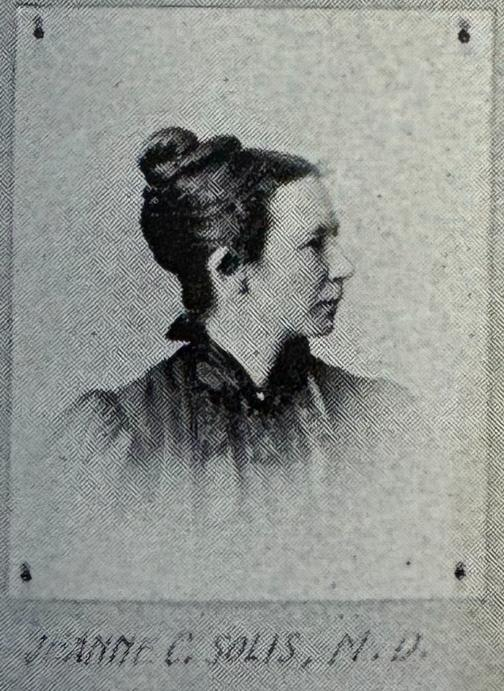
- Photograph of Jeanne Solis from Ann Arbor Headlight: Sights & Scenes Chicago to New York, 1896
- Born: 13 February 1867; Mooretown, Ontario, Canada
- Died: 18 December 1947 (aged 80); Michigan, U.S.
- Education: University of Michigan
- Known for: Likely first woman on neurology academic faculty; translated The Diagnoses of Diseases of the Cord; created Solis award for women in research, 1921-1927
- Scientific career
- Fields: Neurology

Jeanne Cady Solis (13 February 1867 – 18 December 1947) was an early woman neurologist. When she was hired as Assistant to the Professor of Nervous Diseases and Electrotherapeutics at the University of Michigan in 1892, she likely became the first woman ever hired in an academic neurology department

== Early life and family ==
Solis was born in Canada, one of four daughters born to Edwin Solis, an attorney, and Hattie Solis, a pioneer resident of St. Clair, Michigan.

She lived with her younger sister, Electra Blood Solis, for most of her life.

== Early Work at the University of Michigan ==
Solis attended the University of Michigan, graduating in 1892. She was immediately hired in an unsalaried position as Assistant to the Professor of Nervous Diseases and Electrotherapeutics, working under Professor William Herdman and fellow unpaid Assistant Theophil Klingmann. In 1897 she was promoted to Demonstrator and paid $500 a year (Klingmann remained unpaid).

In 1901, Solis published a translation of Joseph Grasset's Diagnosis of Diseases of the Cord: Location of Lesions, from French into English.

When Herdman died in 1906, neurologist Carl D. Camp was hired from the University of Pennsylvania. Solis left the university. She continued to practice private medicine, with a fifty-year career in neurology specializing in "nervous diseases of women and children," according to one obituary.

== The Women's Research Club ==
In 1900, a “Society for the Promotion of Research at the University of Michigan” was founded by eminent male researchers at the University. In 1902, junior researchers founded another Research Club for less elite members. Neither group allowed women, so in October 1902 a Women's Research Club was founded, with Lydia DeWitt the first president.

Solis was President of the Women's Research Club from 1906 to 1907, 1919-1922, 1923-1926 and 1927-1928 when the current president resigned.

From 1921 to 1927, Solis hosted a $25 research prize from her own funds for any woman on campus whose research was the most meritorious. Winners included Frieda Cobb Blanchard, Martha Guernsey, Bessie B. Kanouse and Elizabeth Crosby.

Solis was also instrumental in starting a Women's Research Club Loan Fund. This loan was initially $75 and increased to $100 in 1927. It was to be repaid without interest in 3 years. Recipients included Eileen W. Erlanson Macfarlane, E.K Janaki Ammal and Marian Studley. This loan existed until the 1940s.

== Alpha Epsilon Iota ==
Solis was very active in the physician sorority Alpha Epsilon Iota, serving as their permanent archivist for many years, and hosting and speaking at many events.

== Legacy ==
In 1924, the University of Michigan asked alumnae in a survey to name the ten most outstanding women to ever attend the university. Solis made two women's lists.
