= Robert Douglas Lockhart =

Scottish anatomist

Robert Douglas Lockhart (7 January 1894 – 26 February 1987) was a 20th-century Scottish anatomist. He served as president of the Anatomical Society of Great Britain and Ireland 1955–57. He was also the official Curator of the Marischal Museum.

== Life ==
He was born in Hamilton, South Lanarkshire on 7 January 1894 the son of William Lockhart, nurseryman, and his wife Elizabeth Bogie. The family moved to Aberdeen in the early 20th century, his father being then employed as an auctioneer in the fruit and vegetable market. They lived at Craigiebuckler Cottage in the Rubislaw district. Robert attended Robert Gordon's College in Aberdeen then studied medicine at Aberdeen University from 1913.

His studies were interrupted by the First World War, where he served as a non-commissioned officer (NCO) with the title of Surgeon Probationer in the Royal Navy Volunteer Reserve. He graduated MB ChB from Aberdeen in 1918. He immediately began lecturing at the university. In 1931 he succeeded James Couper Brash as professor of anatomy at the University of Birmingham. He took his then widowed mother to live with him there.

In 1938 he succeeded Prof Alexander Low as professor of anatomy at Aberdeen University. Elizabeth Crosby came to work with him in 1939 and, due to war-time travel restrictions, unintentionally remained until 1941. In 1954 he was elected a Fellow of the Royal Society of Edinburgh. His proposers were Edward Maitland Wright, John Stirling Young, William Ogilvy Kermack and James Couper Brash.

He retired in 1965 but continued the role as curator of Marischal Museum until 1979.

He died at his home, 25 Rubislaw Den North, on 26 February 1987 aged 93. He never married and had no family. He left over £750,000 in his will, largely to scholarships and worthy causes, the bulk going to his alma mater Robert Gordon's College.

A keen horticulturalist, having been trained by his nurseryman father, he created a new black-red rhododendron, "Elizabeth Lockhart", in memory of his mother.

== Publications ==
- Living Anatomy (1948)
- Anatomy of the Human Body (1959)

== Artistic recognition ==
His portrait by Herbert James Gunn hangs in Aberdeen University.

== Links ==
Portrait on Art UK
