= Atractus gaigeae =

Conservation status
- Least Concern (IUCN 3.1)

Scientific classification
- Kingdom: Animalia
- Phylum: Chordata
- Class: Reptilia
- Order: Squamata
- Suborder: Serpentes
- Family: Colubridae
- Genus: Atractus
- Species: A. gaigeae

Binomial name
- Atractus gaigeae Savage, 1955

Synonyms
- Atractus gaigeae Savage, 1955; Atractus collaris gaigeae Dixon & Soini, 1977; Atractus gaigeae Carrillo & Icochea, 1995

Species of snake

Atractus gaigeae, also known commonly as Gaige's ground snake, is a species of snake in the family Colubridae. The species is endemic to Ecuador.

== Etymology ==
The specific name, gaigeae, is in honor of American herpetologist Helen Beulah Thompson Gaige.

== Geographic range ==
A. gaigeae is found in eastern Ecuador, in the Amazon Basin,

== Habitat ==
The preferred natural habitat of A. gaigeae is forest, at altitudes of 200–600 m (660–1,970 ft).

== Description ==
A small species, A gaigeae may attain a snout-to-vent length (SVL) of 29.5 cm (11.6 in) in females, and 26.5 cm (10.4 in) in males. The tail is short, about 10% SVL in females, and about 14% SVL in males.

== Reproduction ==
A. gaigeae is oviparous.
