= Albert R. Shadle =

Dr. Albert R. Shadle (1885–1963) was an American biologist noted for his research into porcupines and beavers. From 1919 until 1953, Shadle served as chairman of the biology department, and was instrumental in the advancement of science education, at the State University of New York at Buffalo. He also acted as a professor of biology whose pupils included noted entomologist Maynard Jack Ramsay.

== Published works ==
=== Journal of Mammalogy (ISSN 0022-2372) ===
- 1957: Sizes of Beaver Chips Cut from Aspen
- 1956: Parturition in a Skunk, Mephitis mephitis hudsonica
- 1955: Removal of Foreign Quills by Porcupines
- 1955: Pelage of the Porcupine, Erethizon dorsatum dorsatum
- 1954: Osteologic Criteria of Age in Beavers
- 1953: Gross Anatomy of the Male Reproductive System of the Porcupine
- 1950: Feeding, Care, and Handling of Captive Porcupines (Erethizon)
- 1949: Rate of Penetration of a Porcupine Spine
- 1948: Gestation Period in the Porcupine, Erethizon dorsatum dorsatum
- 1946: The Sex Reactions of Porcupines (Erethizon d. dorsatum) before and after Copulation
- 1943: An Unusual Porcupine Parturition and Development of the Young
- 1943: Comparison of Tree Cuttings of Six Beaver Colonies in Allegany State Park, New York
- 1939: Fifteen Months of Beaver Work at Allegany State Park, N. Y.
- 1936: The Attrition and Extrusive Growth of the Four Major Incisor Teeth of Domestic Rabbits
- 1930: An Unusual Case of Parturition in a Beaver

=== Journal of Wildlife Management (ISSN 0022-541X) ===
- 1953: Captive Striped Skunk Produces Two Litters
- 1946: Copulation in the Porcupine
- 1943: Reforestation of Aspen after Complete Cutting by Beavers
- 1942: The Deer of Allegany State Park, New York

=== Other publications ===
- 1955: Effects of Porcupine Quills in Humans (The American Naturalist; ISSN 0003-0147)
- 1954: Sizes of Wood Cuttings Handled by Beavers (American Midland Naturalist; ISSN 0003-0031)
- 1939: Craspedacusta Again in Western New York (Transactions of the American Microscopical Society; ISSN 0003-0023)
- 1935: A Zipper Tube for Holding Small Live Animals (Science; ISSN 0036-8075)
