= Tylenchulus semipenetrans =

Scientific classification
- Kingdom: Animalia
- Phylum: Nematoda
- Class: Chromadorea
- Order: Rhabditida
- Family: Tylenchulidae
- Genus: Tylenchulus
- Species: T. semipenetrans

Binomial name
- Tylenchulus semipenetrans Cobb, 1913

Species of roundworm

Tylenchulus semipenetrans, also known as the citrus nematode or citrus root nematode, is a species of plant pathogenic nematodes and the causal agent of slow decline of citrus. T. semipenetrans is found in most citrus production areas and diverse soil textures worldwide. Their feeding strategy is semi-endoparasitic and has a very narrow host range among commonly grown crops. These nematodes are considered as major plant-parasitic nematode because they can cause 10-30% losses reported on citrus trees. They also parasitize other hosts such as olive, grape, persimmon and lilac. The citrus nematode was first discovered in California in 1913 by J. R. Hodges, a horticultural inspector for Los Angeles County, and was later described and named by Nathan Cobb that year. T. semipenetrans is the only species of Tylenchulidae that are economically important to agriculture.

== Morphology ==
Citrus nematodes range in length from 0.25 to 0.35 mm (0.0098 to 0.0138 in) long. They have an amalgamated procorpus and metacorpus, distinct isthmus, and a bulb-shaped postcorpus. They are distinct in juveniles. Both the juvenile stages and the adult male stage are vermiform in shape. The male has significantly reduced esophagus and stylet. The posterior end of the female citrus nematode becomes swollen upon feeding. She contains a single ovary and the vulva is subterminal. The female will lay up to 100 eggs deposited in a gelatinous matrix secreted from the nearby excretory pore. The pore is surrounded by small, irregularly shaped lobes; and the excretory duct is directed forward. The rectum and anus are atrophied or absent and non-functional.

== Life cycle and reproduction ==
Life stages

The life cycle of the female citrus nematode is 6–8 weeks long, whereas the male citrus nematode only lives for about 7–10 days. These nematodes reproduce by amphimixis and parthenogenesis. The first-stage juvenile (J1) undergo one molt while still in the egg. The J1 has no stylet. The second-stage juveniles (J2) hatch from the eggs and the sex can be distinguished at this stage. The J2 male is short and fat. Juveniles will undergo two more molts into the J3 and J4 before becoming young adults. The citrus male nematodes are required for reproduction with females when their posterior end is exposed on the root surface. The J2 male has a stylet while the J3 and J4 have a weaker stylet. The J2 female is longer and thinner than males and they do not molt until feeding site is established. The female juveniles begin feeding ectoparasitically on epidermal root cells. It is not until the female citrus nematode becomes a young adult that she becomes the infective stage. The anterior end of the young female penetrates into the cortex of the root and begins feeding on 3-6 nurse cells. This intense feeding by the adult female will cause the posterior end to enlarge outside the root and start producing eggs. After fertilization, the female lays its eggs outside of the root in a gelatinous matrix extruded from excretory pore located near the vulva.

== Host-parasite interaction ==
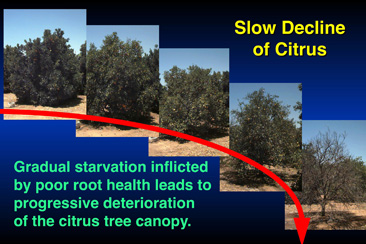
Sequential photos showing progression of slow decline of citrus caused by T. semipenetrans

High population densities of the citrus nematode can result in severe damage on the citrus tree. Some above ground symptoms can be observed such as suppression of citrus tree growth, lack of vigor or decline symptoms, yellowing of foliage and small size of fruit. The young adult females penetrate into the cortex cells, become sedentary and form multiple‘nurse’ cells. The nematode feeding from these nurse cells reduces the amount of water and nutrients available to the growing plant.

For below ground symptoms, the infected roots are thicker, darker, decayed and appear dirty. This is caused by soil particles sticking the gelatinous matrices which have been excreted by the females. The infected root systems due to the nematode damage lose the ability to absorb enough water and nutrients for normal growth. Yellowing of foliage, leaf curling and dieback are consequences of insufficient root development and decayed young roots.

According to E. Cohn, 4000 juveniles per gram of root are the damage threshold for slow decline disease in Israel. In Cyprus, the growers need to apply nematicides when the nematode densities reach 5000 juveniles per 250 cm^{3} (15 cu in) in soil. Treatments are recommended when 100 females per gram of root are observed in South Africa. However, the age and vigor of the citrus trees, the nematode population densities in the soil, the aggressiveness of the nematodes, soil characteristics, and other environmental factors can influence the level of infestation by citrus nematode.

== Management of the citrus nematode ==
Management practices consist of exclusion, preventive measures, and post-planting nematicide applications. All growers should avoid contaminated nursery rootstocks and use certified nematode-free soil and nematode-free rootstock (it is obligatory in some areas). Nematodes can easily be removed from seedlings by dipping the roots in 45 °C (113 °F) water for 25 minutes, which kills the nematodes but does not harm the plant. For cultural practices, the container-grown citrus can be treated with steam and soil solarization. Fumigation and nematicides are used to reduced initial population densities. Halogenated hydro-carbons (MBr,1-3-D and chloropicrin) are the most effective. Resistant rootstocks are available and this management strategy is the most useful to suppress nematode population density. Recently, the hybrid rootstock called Swingle citrumelo (Citrus paradisi x P. trifoliata) is highly resistant to the citrus nematode.

In California, the Statewide Integrated Pest Management Program of the University of California suggests chemical control of nematodes with application dependent on population levels of nematodes. For low presence of nematodes, a pesticide application may not be economical, but at medium to high populations, nematicides can be prevent significant decline in fruit size and yield. The program considers less than 2000 juveniles per 500 g (18 oz) of soil from February to April and less than 4000 juveniles per 500 g of soil from May to July to be low population levels. For females, less than 100 individuals per 1 g (0.035 oz) from February to April and less than 300 per 1 g of soil from May to June are considered low levels.
