= Michel Luc =

Michel Luc (7 February 1927 – 18 January 2010) was a French zoologist (nematologist) and one of the founding fathers of the field of plant-nematology. He spent his career with ORSTOM (Office de la Recherche Scientifique et Technique Outre-Mer), now IRD (Institut de recherche pour le développement). He created the first French nematology laboratory in the ORSTOM research station of Adiopodoumé, near Abidjan (Ivory Coast) in 1955, and a second nematology lab at Dakar Bel-Air (Senegal) in 1969. In 1978, he launched the Revue de Nématologie (soon renamed Fundamental and Applied Nematology) that fused with Nematologica in 1999 to become Nematology, currently the leading nematology journal in the field. He was a world-renowned authority on nematode taxonomy.

== Biography ==
Michel Luc was born on 7 February 1927 in Tunis (Tunisia). From 1945, on, he studied biology in Paris at the Sorbonne, where he attended classes delivered by biologists such as Georges Mangenot in Botany and Pierre-Paul Grassé in Zoology. After earning a Licence de Sciences Naturelles in 1948, he was hired as a trainee (élève) at ORSTOM in 1950. He died on 18 January 2010, a few days after his wife, Mariette Luc.

== Positions ==
He began his career at ORSTOM as a phytopathologist, specializing in tropical cultures. He was first posted at the IDERT (Institut d'Enseignement et de Recherches Tropicales) center of Adiopodoumé, near Abidjan (Ivory Coast), in the phytopathology lab directed by Prof. Jean Chevaugeon. He worked there for several years, publishing a dozen articles on tropical parasitic fungi between 1951 and 1954. In 1954, he was sent to be trained as a nematologist with Prof. Nigon in Lyon, then with Prof. De Coninck in Ghent, Belgium, and with Dr Seinhorst and Prof. Oostenbrink in the Netherlands.

In 1955, he returned to IDERT in the Ivory Coast where he set up the first French tropical nematology laboratory. He served as Director pro temp of the whole IDERT center in 1960 then as full-time Director of this center from 1966 to 1969. After a short stay from September 1969 to June 1970 at the INRA (Institut National de la Recherche Agronomique) nematology lab of Maurice Ritter in Antibes, he was sent to Dakar, Senegal, where he created a second nematology lab at Bel-Air.

After leaving Africa in 1975, he was posted in Paris where Prof. Alain Chabaud welcomed him in his Laboratoire des Vers, specializing in parasitic nematodes, helminths, and protozoa, at the Muséum National d'Histoire Naturelle. He worked there until his retirement in 1992, handling the editing of Revue de Nématologie, continuing his taxonomic work, and supervising the ORSTOM Nematology labs.

== Accomplishments ==
He was one of the handful of biologists who developed the then little-known field of plant nematology after WWII, and gave this group of devastating parasites the recognition they deserve. As a scientist, he gained a worldwide reputation with his work on the systematics of plant-nematodes, particularly those in the genus Xiphinema in which he described 41 new species. He also worked extensively on the Criconematid (20 n.spp.), Pratylenchid (6 n.spp.) and Heteroderid (4 n.spp.) families and he also described a few new species in other groups, to a total of over 87 new species. In addition, he described three new genera, Hirschmanniella (Luc & Goodey, 1962), that includes some of the most destructive pests of rice, Hylonema Luc, Taylor & Cadet, 1978, and Senegalonema Germani, Luc & Baldwin, 1983. In spite of this large number of new taxa, he considered himself to be a "lumper" and spent considerable energy fighting against the "taxonomic inflation" created by excessive splitting of taxa. In 1987, he led a team (including Armand Maggenti, Renaud Fortuner, Dewey Raski, and Etienne Geraert) for a complete reorganization of the taxonomy of the order Tylenchida, a work which is still accepted as valid today.

In 1978, he launched Revue de Nématologie that soon became a very successful and widely read publication in the field. He saw this journal through its transformation in 1992 into Fundamental and Applied Nematology. He served as Editor for both journals, then as Honorary Editor after his retirement, in 1992. The journal was purchased by E.J. Brill in 1999 and fused with Nematologica to become the current Nematology, with Michel listed as Honorary Editor. He was also a member of the Editorial boards of Nematologia Mediterranea from 1973 till 1995 and Nematologica from 1973 till the fusion of that journal with Fundamental and Applied Nematology.

== Teaching ==
As Head of the Nematology laboratory within the Biology Department of ORSTOM, from its creation until his retirement in 1992, he supervised the scientific beginnings of many French tropical nematologists.

After the death of S. A. (Skip) Sher, in 1975, he was invited for six months at the University of California, Riverside, under a UCR-funded fellowship for teaching the advanced nematology classes given each year by that institution. He later returned several times to UCR on study leaves and he developed a collaboration with Van Gundy, Diana Freckman-Wall, and Jim Baldwin. Part of Michel Luc's legacy were many years of collaboration between UCR and scientists from Senegal and Ivory Coast, with Yves Demeure, Jean-Claude Prot, and Gaetano Germani (work on Scutellonema) having extended working visits at UCR. He was also a visiting professor for 4 months at the University of California at Davis in 1977.

In addition, he was invited by Prof. Aeschlimann at the University of Neuchâtel, in Switzerland, where he gave nematology classes almost every year. Prof. Aeschlimann asked the Faculté des Sciences of his university to grant Michel Luc the title of Docteur honoris causa in 1987, which was unanimously accepted. He also spent six months in Ghent (Belgium) where he worked with Prof. Coomans.

== Publications ==
Michel Luc has widely published in books, monographs, and journals. After an early contribution to the knowledge of tropical fungi with 10 papers between 1951 and 1954, he published over 150 nematological articles, mostly in Revue de Nématologie (later Fundamental and Applied Nematology, then Nematology) with 59 papers, in Nematologica with 28 papers, and in many other journals such as Proceedings of the Helminthological Society of Washington, Comptes rendus de l'académie des sciences, Agronomie Tropicale, Bulletin du Muséum national d'histoire naturelle, Systematic Parasitology, Nematologia Mediterranea, etc. He contributed to various books and he was one of the Scientific Editors of Plant-parasitic nematodes in subtropical and tropical agriculture, published by CAB International, Wallingford, Oxfordshire, in 1990.

== Honors and awards ==
- Chevalier de l'Ordre National du Mérite
- Officier de l'Ordre National du Mérite Agricole
- Médaille du mérite ivoirien", from President Houphouët-Boigny in 1969
- Honorary citizen of the town of Daytona Beach (Florida) in 1966
- Fellow of Society Of Nematologists (SON) in 1986
- Fellow of European Society of Nematologists (ESN) in 1992
- Doctor honoris causa from the University of Neuchâtel (Switzerland) in 1987
- Member (Correspondent national honoraire) of the Académie d'agriculture de France in 1989
