= Elizabeth C. Crosby =

American neuro-anatomist (1888–1983)

Elizabeth Caroline Crosby
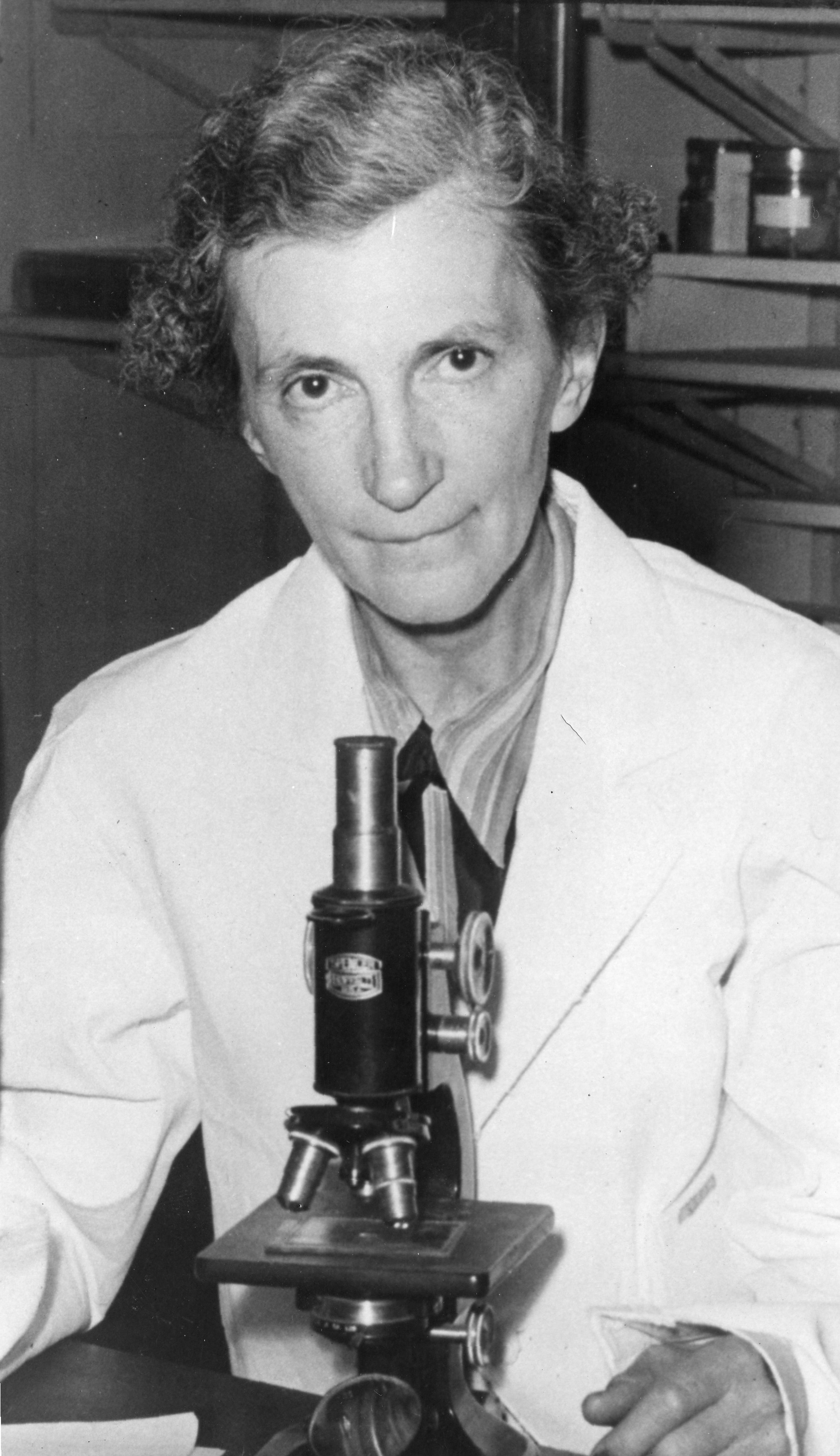
- Crosby c. 1950
- Born: October 25, 1888; Petersburg, Michigan
- Died: July 28, 1983 (aged 94)
- Other name: Elizabeth C. Crosby
- Education: University of Chicago
- Awards: National Medal of Science, Achievement Award of the American Association of University Women, Henry Gray Award of the American Association of Anatomists
- Scientific career
- Fields: Neuroanatomy, neuroscience, neurosurgery
- Workplaces: University of Alabama Birmingham, University of Michigan Medical School
- Thesis: The Forebrain of Alligator Mississippiensis (1915)
- Doctoral advisor: Charles Judson Herrick

Elizabeth Caroline Crosby (October 25, 1888 – July 28, 1983) was an American neuroanatomist. Crosby received the National Medal of Science from President Jimmy Carter in 1979 "for outstanding contributions to comparative and human neuroanatomy and for the synthesis and transmission of knowledge of the entire nervous system of the vertebrate phylum." Her "careful descriptions" of vertebrate brains – especially reptiles – helped "outline evolutionary history" and her work as a clinical diagnostic assistant to neurosurgeons resulted in "the correlation of anatomy and surgery."

== Education and career ==
Elizabeth C. Crosby was born to Lewis Frederick and Francis Kreps Crosby in Petersburg, Michigan in 1888. She graduated from Adrian College with a Bachelor of Science in mathematics in 1910. Influenced by professor of physics and chemistry Elmer Jones, she attended the University of Chicago under C. Judson Herrick and received her Masters of Science in biology in 1912 and then her Ph.D. in anatomy in 1915 via a fellowship. In 1920, Crosby accepted a teaching position in the University of Michigan's department of anatomy under G. Carl Huber; her classes included histology and neuroanatomy. In 1923, Crosby took a sabbatical to work with the renowned scientist C. U. Ariëns Kappers at the Central Institute for Brain Research in Amsterdam. While there, she contributed significantly to The Comparative Anatomy of the Nervous System of Vertebrates (1936). Although Crosby did not have a medical background, she became the first woman to receive full professorship at the University of Michigan Medical School, in 1936 and the first to receive the university's Faculty Achievement Award, given in 1956.

In 1939 she took a sabbatical to work with Prof Robert Douglas Lockhart at the University of Aberdeen in Scotland. Due to introduction of wartime trans-Atlantic travel restrictions in the Second World War she unintentionally remained there until 1941.

She eventually became professor emeritus of Anatomy and Consultant of Neurosurgery before leaving the University of Michigan for University of Alabama at Birmingham in 1963, where she again became professor emeritus of Anatomy. She was inducted into the Alabama Women's Hall of Fame in 1987. Crosby's excellence in teaching was officially recognized in 1957 when the Galens Society of the University of Michigan Medical School established the Elizabeth C. Crosby annual award for the best preclinical teaching in the school.

Other distinctions and awards include:

- 1926, the Jeanne Cady Solis Award from the University of Michigan
- 1946, the Henry Russell Lectureship from the University of Michigan
- 1950, the Achievement Award of the American Association of University Women
- 1957, the Elizabeth C. Crosby award for best preclinical teaching was established by the University of Michigan Medical School's Galens Society
- 1969, Karl Spencer Lashley Award
- 1970, the Honorary Doctorate of Sciences from the University of Michigan
- 1972, the Henry Gray Award of the American Association of Anatomists
- 1980, Distinguished Faculty Lecturer from the University of Alabama Birmingham
- 1980, National Medal of Science presented by President Jimmy Carter

== Selected works ==
- 1917, "The forebrain of alligator mississippiensis", Journal of Comparative Neurology, 79 (1):1-14.
- 1936, with Cornelius Ubbo Ariëns Kappers and G. Carl Huber, The Comparative Anatomy of the Nervous System of Vertebrates, including Man: vol. 1, vol. 2. New York: Hafner Publishing Company. OCLC 560551865.
- 1955, with Kahn, Edgar A.; Basset, Robert; Schbeider, Richard C., "Correlative neurosurgery": , Springfield: Charles C. Thomas. A 2nd edition in 1969, last 3rd edition in 1982.
- 1960, with Herrick, C. Judson (Charles Judson), "A Laboratory outline of neurology": .Philadelphia, W. B. Saunders.
- 1962, with Tryphena Humphrey Correlative Anatomy of the Nervous System. New York: Macmillan. OCLC 557246.
- 1976, with Augustine, J., "The functional significance of certain duplicate motor patterns on the cerebral cortex in primates including man", Clinical Neurology and Neurosurgery,79(1):1-14 .
- 1982, with H. N. Schnitzlein, "Comparative correlative neuroanatomy of the vertebrate telencephalon": . New York, McMillan.
