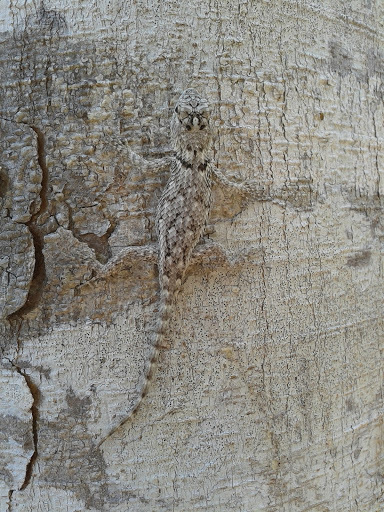

Conservation status
- Least Concern (IUCN 3.1)

Scientific classification
- Kingdom: Animalia
- Phylum: Chordata
- Class: Reptilia
- Order: Squamata
- Suborder: Iguania
- Family: Phrynosomatidae
- Genus: Sceloporus
- Species: S. lundelli

Binomial name
- Sceloporus lundelli H.M. Smith, 1939

= Sceloporus lundelli =

Species of lizard

Sceloporus lundelli, also known commonly as Lundell's spiny lizard and la espinosa de Lundell in Mexican Spanish, is a species of lizard in the family Phrynosomatidae. The species is native to the Yucatán Peninsula in Mexico, Belize, and Guatemala. There are two recognized subspecies.

== Geographic range ==
S. lundelli is found in the Mexican states of Campeche, Quintana Roo, Tabasco, and Yucatán, in the Belizean district of Cayo, and in the Guatemalan department of El Petén.

== Habitat ==
The preferred natural habitat of S. lundelli is forest at altitudes from sea level to 300 m (980 ft), but it has also been found in urban areas.

== Description ==
Adults of S. lundelli may attain a snout-to-vent length (SVL) of 8.5–10 cm (3.3–3.9 in).

== Behavior ==
S. lundelli is diurnal and arboreal.

== Reproduction ==
The mode of reproduction of S. lundelli is uncertain: it has been reported to be oviparous, but may be viviparous.

== Subspecies ==
Two subspecies are recognized as being valid, including the nominotypical subspecies.

- Sceloporus lundelli gaigeae H.M. Smith, 1939
- Sceloporus lundelli lundelli H.M. Smith, 1939

== Etymologies ==
The specific name, lundelli, is in honor of American botanist Cyrus Longworth Lundell.

The subspecific name, gaigeae, is in honor of American herpetologist Helen Beulah Thompson Gaige.
