= G. Carl Huber =

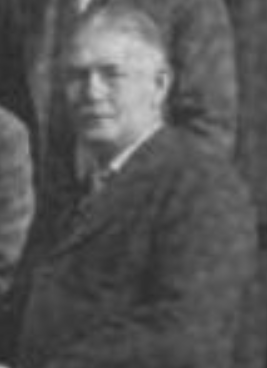
G. Carl Huber, Dean, in 1928

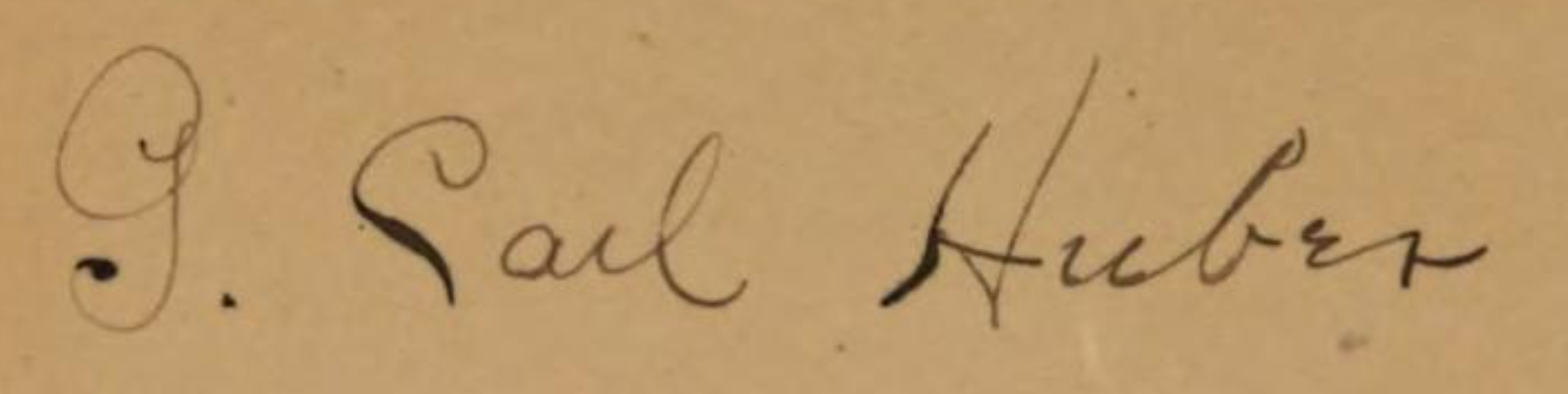
Autograph of G. Carl Huber

Gotthelf Carl Huber (30 August 1865 - 26 December 1934) was a German-Swiss American immigrant, scientist and neurosurgeon.

== Career ==
Huber is described as a "a foundational figure in the development of peripheral nerve surgery." Huber collaborated with many others, including Elizabeth Caroline Crosby (1888-1983).

Huber was chairman of the Medical Fellowship Board of the National Research Council, up to his death.

== Personal life ==
Huber was born in Hoobly, India, son of German-Swiss missionary parents. They migrated to the United States when Huber was four years old. By that time he knew both German and an Indian language, English was his third language.

Huber married Lucy Anna Parker and had three children, a daughter Lucy (later Lucy Huber Andrus), and two sons Carl Parker Huber and John Franklin Huber, both of the University of Michigan faculty.
