= Geophis blanchardi =

Conservation status
- Data Deficient (IUCN 3.1)

Scientific classification
- Kingdom: Animalia
- Phylum: Chordata
- Class: Reptilia
- Order: Squamata
- Suborder: Serpentes
- Family: Colubridae
- Genus: Geophis
- Species: G. blanchardi

Binomial name
- Geophis blanchardi Taylor & H.M. Smith, 1939

Species of snake

Geophis blanchardi, also known commonly as Blanchard's earth snake and la minadora de Blanchard in Mexican Spanish, is a species of snake in the subfamily Dipsadinae of the family Colubridae. The species is endemic to Mexico.

== Etymology ==
The specific name, blanchardi, is in honor of American herpetologist Frank N. Blanchard.

== Geographic range ==
G. blanchardi is found in eastern Mexico, in the Mexican states of Oaxaca, Puebla, and Veracruz.

== Habitat ==
The preferred natural habitat of G. blanchardi is forest, at altitudes of 1,000–2,510 m (3,280–8,230 ft).

== Description ==
Dorsally, G. blanchardi is bluish-gray to brownish-black. Ventrally, it is checkered yellowish-orange and black. It has smooth dorsal scales, which are arranged in 17 rows throughout the length of the body, and do not have apical pits. It has seven lower labials, one postocular, and no anterior temporal. It may attain a total length (including tail) of about 40 cm (16 in). The tail length is about 17% of the total length in males, about 13% in females.

== Behavior ==
G. blanchardi is terrestrial.

== Reproduction ==
G. blanchardi is oviparous.
