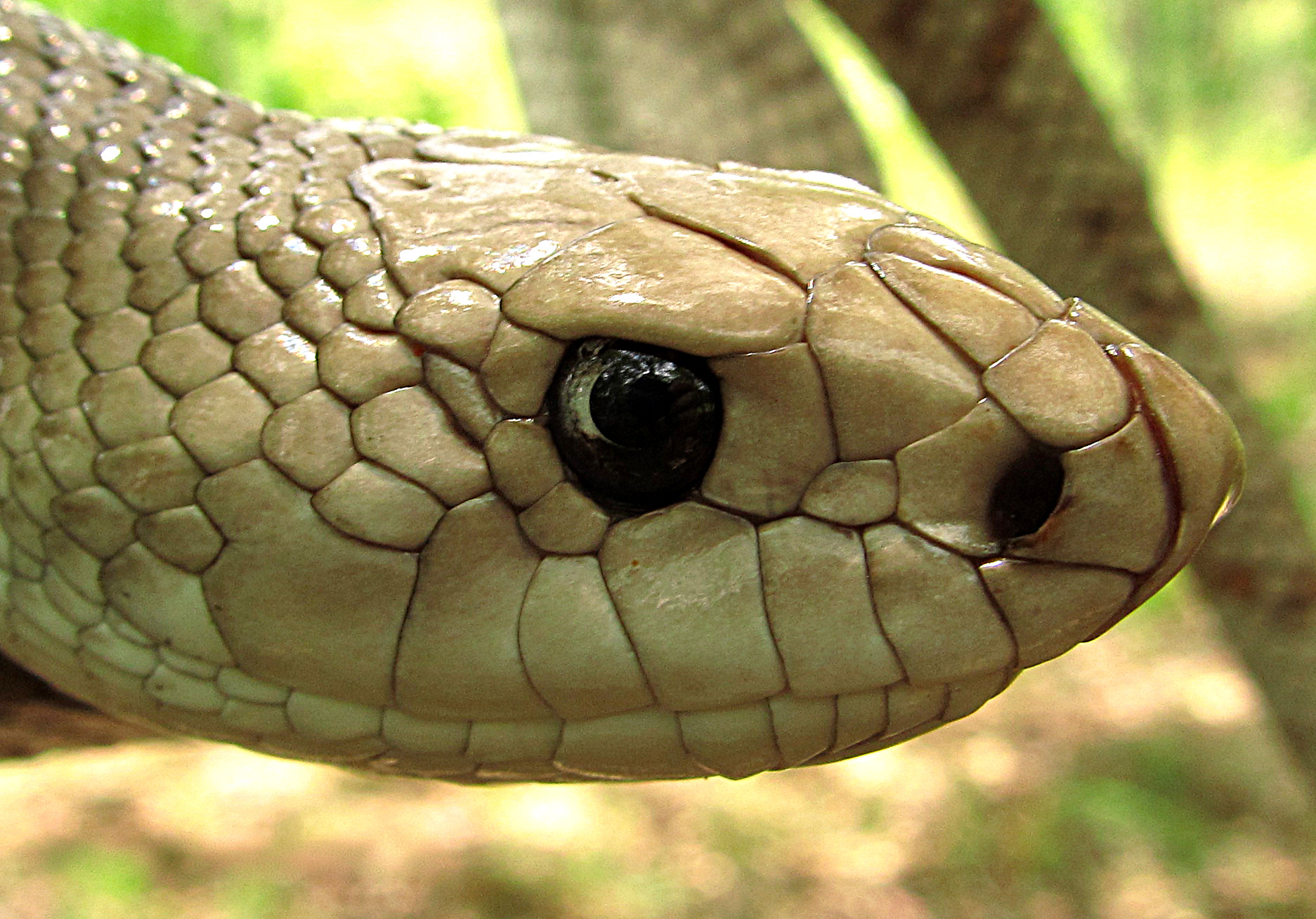

Conservation status
- Vulnerable (NatureServe)

Scientific classification
- Kingdom: Animalia
- Phylum: Chordata
- Class: Reptilia
- Order: Squamata
- Suborder: Serpentes
- Family: Colubridae
- Genus: Pituophis
- Species: P. melanoleucus
- Subspecies: P. m. mugitus

Trinomial name
- Pituophis melanoleucus mugitus Barbour, 1921

= Pituophis melanoleucus mugitus =

Subspecies of snake

Pituophis melanoleucus mugitus, commonly known as the Florida pinesnake or Florida pine snake, is a subspecies of nonvenomous snake in the family Colubridae. The species is endemic to the Coastal Plain of the southeastern United States. It is one of three subspecies of the species Pituophis melanoleucus.

== Taxonomy ==
Discovered by Thomas Barbour in 1921, P. m. mugitus intergrades with the other subspecies of P. melanoleucus along the borders of their ranges.

Common names for P. m. mugitus include "Florida pine snake" and "Florida pinesnake".

== Description ==
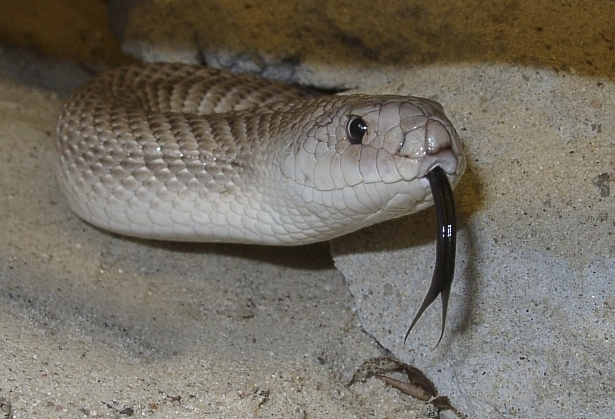
P. m. mugitus with its tongue flicked; pictured is a patternless morph

Adults of P. m. mugitus are heavy bodied. They vary in size significantly, but generally are large, averaging 48–66-inch (120–170 cm) long; the longest recorded was 90 inches (230 cm). Their pattern consists of dark brown or rust colored splotches on a tan or light cream background color. Toward the head, these markings are more faded and darker; toward the tail, they are more vivid. To differentiate based on age, the darkness of the markings may be used: in young individuals, the dark markings are more defined.

Based on region, the color may vary, with some populations being exceptionally pale while others are exceptionally dark.

== Distribution and habitat ==
P. m. mugitus is endemic to the Coastal Plain of the southeastern United States. Specifically, its range is limited to the following states:

- Alabama, status S2 (Note: Status S2 means "imperiled" or at high risk of extirpation (local extinction) in the jurisdiction.)
- South Carolina, status S2
- Florida, status S3 (Note: Status S3 means "vulnerable" or at moderate risk of extirpation (local extinction) in the jurisdiction.)
- Georgia, status S3

Within these states, the subspecies can be found in high pinelands, sandy places, sand pine scrub, pine flatwoods on well-drained soils, and old fields on former sandhill sites. However, during drought, it seeks open habitats around wetlands. Additionally, it has been observed that, when available, it uses gopher tortoise burrows as refuge.

== Ecology ==
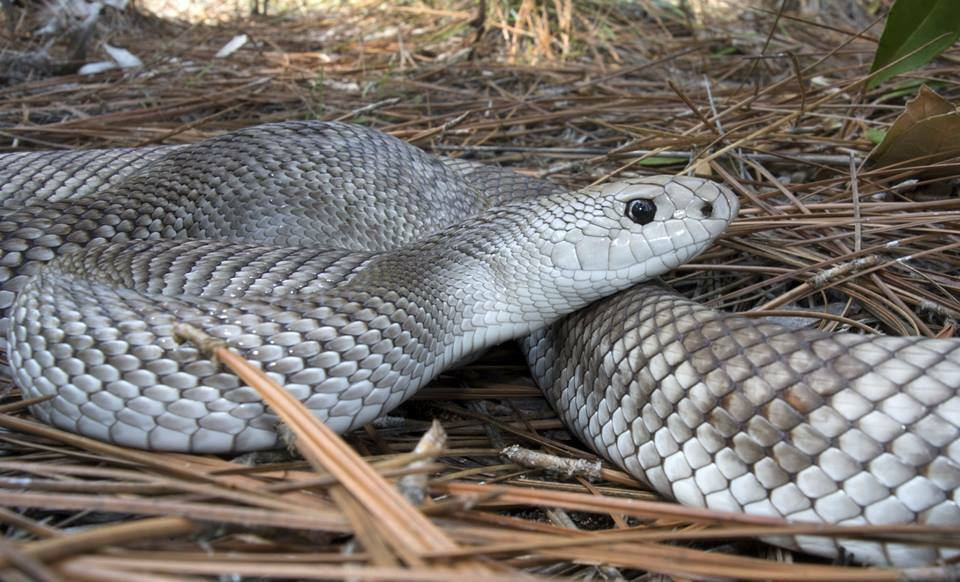
P. m. mugitus with a light pattern

As a powerful constrictor, P. m. mugitus preys on small mammals, rabbits, and other rodents, primarily. Less commonly, they can eat ground-dwelling birds, bird eggs, and lizards. They actively forage above and below ground. For example, they are known to use their snout to dig into pocket gopher burrows. They are also known to press prey against the walls of burrows to immobilize and/or constrict prey.

When threatened, P. m. mugitus can initiate a display that includes coiling up, inflating its body, hissing loudly, and creating a rattle-like noise by shaking its tail in dry leaves. The notably loud hissing is generated by passing exhaled air over a flap of tissue that reaches across the air opening in the partially-open mouth.

P. m. mugitus is diurnal and fossorial. Inactive in cold weather, they are active in the months of March through October, with peak activity in the months of May, June, July and October.

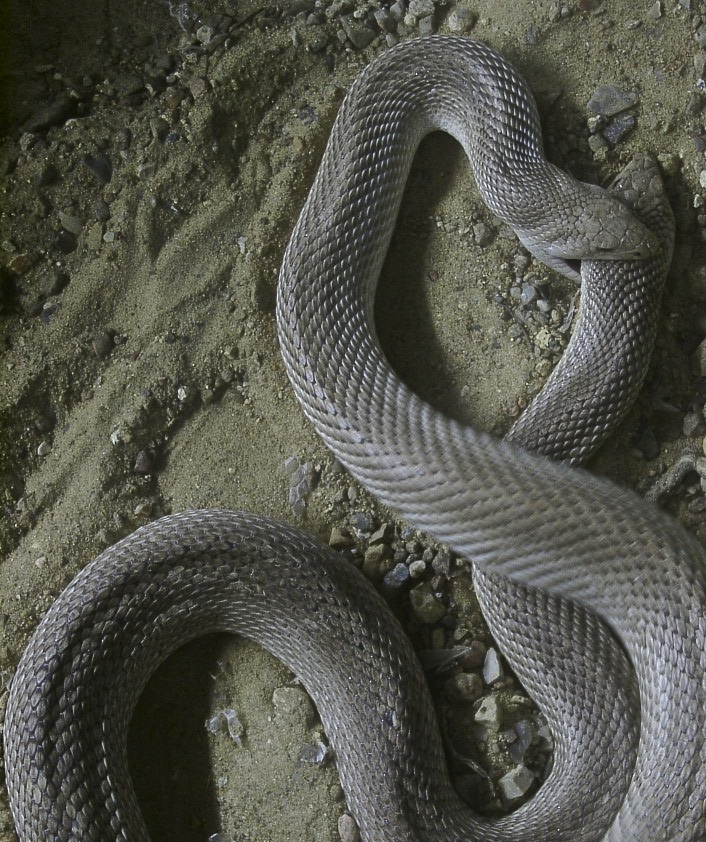
Patternless morph P. m. mugitus individuals mating. The male bites the female's neck to hold her.

=== Reproduction ===
In order to reproduce, during spring and early summer, adult males will begin to search large areas of their habitat for females. Upon discovery of a female, the male holds on to the female by biting her neck; he then proceeds to wrap around her and rub his body against hers. The entire process can take several hours to complete.

After mating, the female lays the clutch of eggs, usually containing 4-12 large, white, leathery eggs, in June, July, or August. These eggs may be laid in the burrow of another animal or in an egg chamber excavated by the female. The eggs hatch 67-72 days after laying, likely in September and October.

P. m mugitus hatchlings are larger than most snake hatchlings with an average length of 15 inches.

== Conservation status ==
In addition to the state-level conservation statuses previously noted, P. m. mugitus has been classified by NatureServe as G4T3; this means that while the species, P. melanoleucus, is 'apparently secure', the specific subspecies of P. m. mugitus is 'vulnerable'. NatureServe defines 'apparently secure' as "at fairly low risk of extinction or collapse" and 'vulnerable' as "at moderate risk of extinction or collapse".

Additionally, the population is assumed to be declining as a result of habitat loss. This loss includes the removal of tree stumps, which causes a decrease in the amount of underground habitat structures. In addition, predation at all stages of life from nine-banded armadillos, feral hogs, and red imported fire ants could be increasing. Finally, mortality caused by humans, domesticated pets, and roads all contribute to further harm to the subspecies.

In order to increase the stability of this subspecies, some say it is necessary to establish large, connected tracts of land that undergo regular controlled burns. The continuity of these tracts of land could help maintain genetic diversity, while the controlled burns would help maintain the habitat for P. m. mugitus, among many other species. Corroborating this is NatureServe's Management Requirements, which directly state the need for consistent controlled burns. Additionally, the mean home range size among P. m. mugitus was measured to be 59.2 ha (146 acres), emphasizing the idea that large tracts of land are necessary.
