= Paul Quattlebaum House =

Historic house in South Carolina, United States

- U.S. National Register of Historic Places
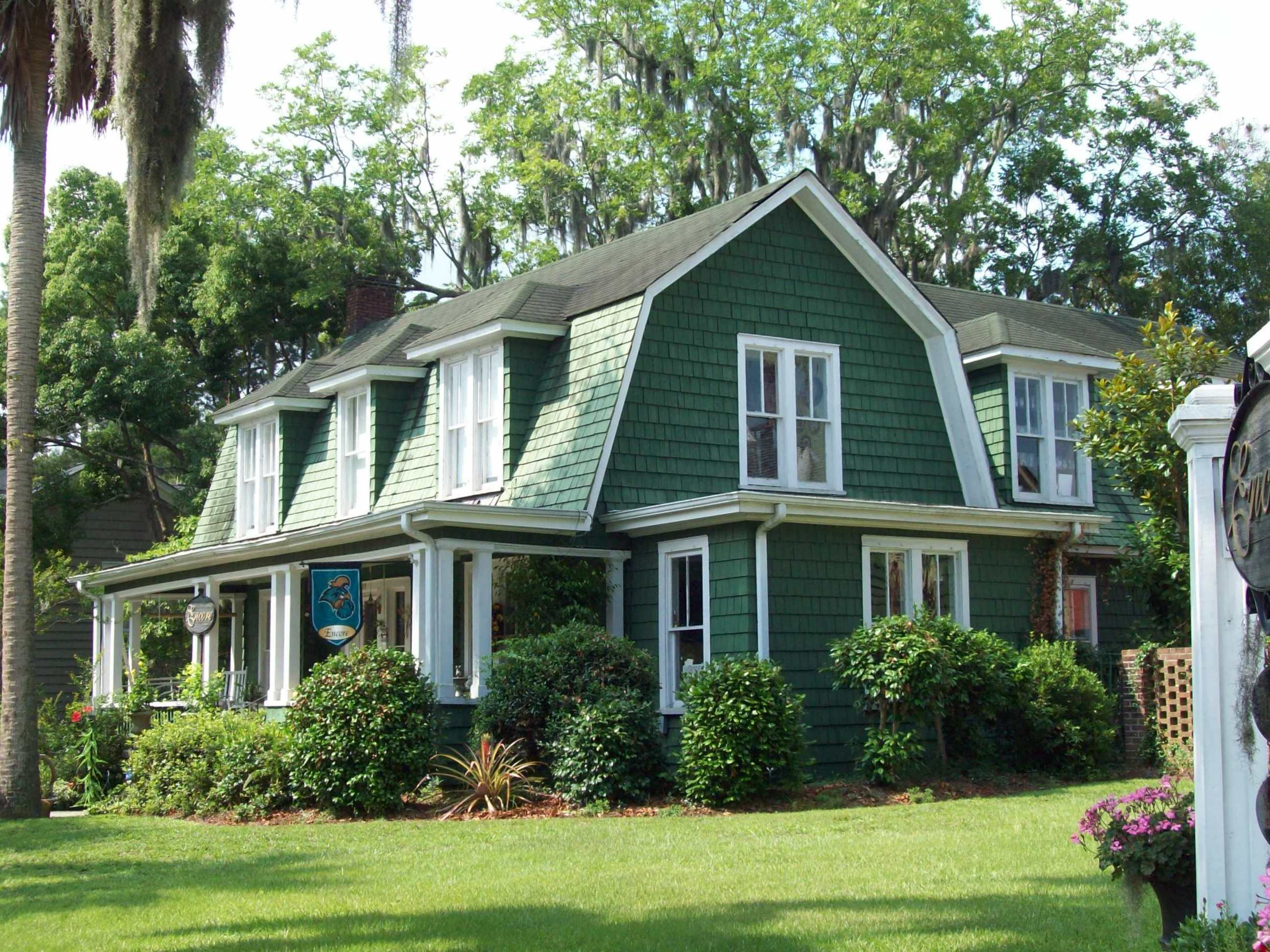
- Paul Quattlebaum House, June 2010

- Location within South Carolina Location within the United States
- Location: 225 Kingston St., Conway, South Carolina, U.S.
- Coordinates: 33°50′6″N 79°2′43″W
- Area: 0.3 acres (0.12 ha)
- Built: c. 1890
- Architectural style: Dutch Colonial Revival
- MPS: Conway MRA
- NRHP reference No.: 86002231
- Added to NRHP: August 5, 1986

Paul Quattlebaum House is a historic home in Conway, Horry County, South Carolina, It was built about 1890 and is a 1½-story, gambrel-roofed, single-clad frame residence. It was remodeled in 1911 in the Dutch Colonial Revival style by Paul Quattlebaum to take its present form.

It was listed on the National Register of Historic Places in 1986.
