= Frederick M. Gaige =

American entomologist

Frederick McMahon Gaige (3 July 1890, Ann Arbor – 20 October 1976, Keystone Heights) was an American entomologist and herpetologist.
