= Alexander Grant Ruthven =

American herpetologist and president of the University of Michigan (1882–1971)

Alexander G. Ruthven
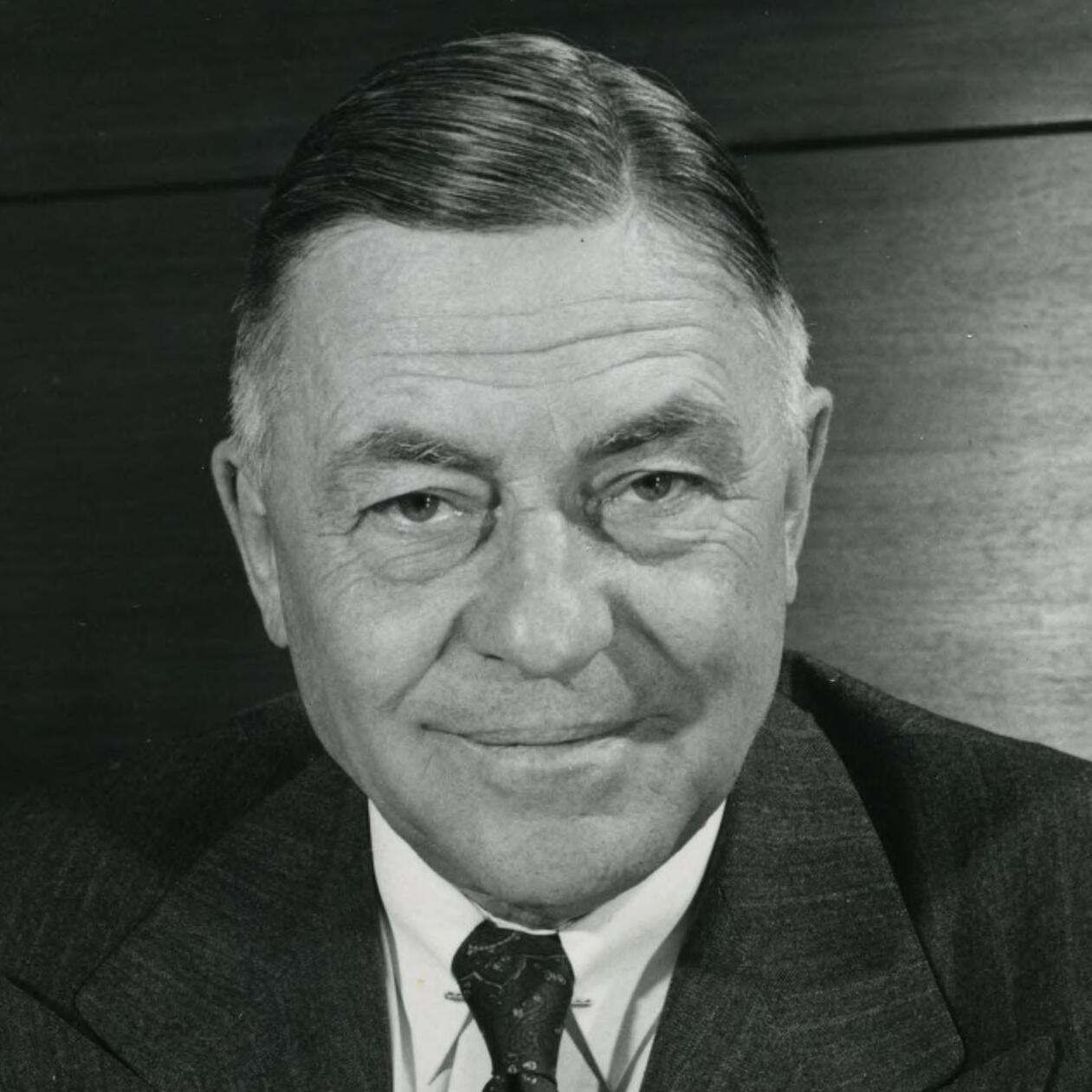
- Ruthven c. 1950s

7th President of the University of Michigan
- In office 1929–1951
- Preceded by: Clarence Cook Little
- Succeeded by: Harlan Hatcher

Personal details
- Born: January 1, 1882 Hull, Iowa
- Died: January 19, 1971 (aged 89)
- Education: Morningside College, University of Michigan
- Profession: academic administrator, herpetologist

Alexander Grant Ruthven (April 1, 1882 – January 19, 1971) was a herpetologist, zoologist and the President of the University of Michigan from 1929 to 1951.

== Biography ==
Alexander Grant Ruthven was born in 1882 in Hull, Iowa. He graduated from Morningside College in 1903. In 1906, he received a Ph.D. in zoology from the University of Michigan. He worked as a professor, director of the University Museum, and Dean. He became the President in 1929. As such, he promoted a corporate administrative structure. He also approved of police raids against bootleggers at fraternities. He was elected to the American Philosophical Society in 1931. He retired in 1951, and died in 1971. He is buried at Forest Hill Cemetery which is adjacent to the university.

The work of Ruthven on the familiar garter snakes, published in 1908, may regarded as founding an essentially new school of herpetology in the United States. This was a revision of a genus, carried out by the examination of large numbers of specimens, and evaluated largely in geographic terms. Ruthven attracted many students of reptiles to the University of Michigan, his most brilliant pupils being Frank N. Blanchard and Helen T. Gaige. Ruthven described and named 16 new species of reptiles, including three with Gaige.

== Legacy ==
Ruthven is commemorated in the scientific names of seven reptiles: Geophis ruthveni, Holbrookia maculata ruthveni, Lampropeltis ruthveni, Lepidoblepharis ruthveni, Macropholidus ruthveni, Masticophis schotti ruthveni, and Pituophis ruthveni.

He also mentored many young herpetologists, such as Laura Brodie.

== Writings ==
- Miscellaneous Papers on the Zoology of Michigan, W.H. Crawford Co., 1916
- A Naturalist in a University Museum, 1931
- Laboratory Directions in Principles of Animal Biology, by Aaron Franklin Shull, George Roger Larue, Alexander Grant Ruthven, McGraw-Hill Book Company, Inc, 1942
- Naturalist in Two Worlds. Random Recollections of a University President, 1963
- The Herpetology of Michigan
- Description of a New Salamander from Iowa
- Variations and Genetic Relationships of the Garter-Snakes
- The Amphibians and Reptiles of the Sierra Nevada de Santa Marta, Columbia, etc. With map

Academic offices
Preceded by Clarence Cook Little	7th President of the University of Michigan; 1929–1951	Succeeded by Harlan Hatcher
