= Nathan Cobb =

American biologist (1859–1932)

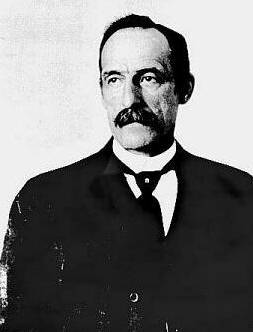
- Born: June 30, 1859; Spencer, Massachusetts, U.S.
- Died: June 4, 1932 (aged 72); Baltimore, Maryland, U.S.
- Known for: Providing the foundations for nematode taxonomy
- Children: Frjeda Blanchard
- Scientific career
- Fields: Nematology
- Workplaces: USDA Nematology Laboratory
- Author abbrev. (botany): Cobb

Nathan Augustus Cobb (30 June 1859 – 4 June 1932) is known as "the father of nematology in the United States".

He provided the foundations for nematode taxonomy and described over 1000 different nematode species. His technical innovations in nematological methods included fixation and preservation techniques; the Cobb metal mounting slide; improvements in photography and microscopic equipment; and the first device to use flotation to remove nematodes from soil. An individual with a variety of skills, he made significant contributions to a number of scientific disciplines and the USDA Nematology Laboratory, originally established with him as the director, continues today.

He was the father of Frjeda Blanchard, the geneticist who first demonstrated Mendelian inheritance in reptiles.

== Books ==
This list can be accessed via the Biodiversity Heritage Library. The list is incomplete.

- "A Nematode formula." (1890) Sydney : C. Potter
- "Nematodes, mostly Australian and Fijian." (1893) Sydney : F. Cunninghame & Co., printers
- "The sheep-fluke." (1897) Sydney : W. A. Gullick, gov't. printer
- "Letters on the diseases of plants." (1897) Sydney : W. A. Gullick, gov't. printer
- "Seed wheat: an investigation and discussion of the relative value as seed of large plump and small shrivelled grains." (1903) Sydney : W. A. Gullick, gov't. printer
- "Letters on the diseases of plants. Second series." (1904) Sydney : W. A. Gullick, gov't. printer
- "Methods of using the microscope, camera-lucida and solar projector for purposes of examination and the production of illustrations." (1905) Honolulu : Hawaiian Sugar Planters' Association
- "Contributions to a science of nematology." (1914–35) Baltimore : Williams & Wilkins Co.
