= Frank N. Blanchard =

- Born: December 19, 1888; Stoneham, Massachusetts, U.S.
- Died: September 21, 1937 (aged 48)
- Education: Tufts University; University of Michigan
- Spouse: Frjeda Blanchard (née Cobb)
- Scientific career
- Fields: Herpetology
- Institutions: Massachusetts State College, Amherst, Smithsonian Institution, University of Michigan

Frank Nelson Blanchard (December 19, 1888 – September 21, 1937) was an American herpetologist, and professor of zoology at the University of Michigan from which institution he received his Ph.D. He is credited with describing several new subspecies, including the broad-banded water snake, Nerodia fasciata confluens, and the Florida king snake, Lampropeltis getula floridana. Additionally, he has been honored by having reptiles and amphibians named after him, including the western smooth green snake, Opheodrys vernalis blanchardi, and Blanchard's cricket frog, Acris crepitans blanchardi.

Born in Stoneham, Massachusetts, Blanchard attained his Bachelor of Science in biology from Tufts University in 1913. He received his doctorate in zoology from the University of Michigan in 1919, where he studied with Helen Gaige under Dr. Alexander Grant Ruthven. His thesis was an extensive account of the genus Lampropeltis, the king snakes.

From 1913 until 1916, he taught zoology at Massachusetts State College in Amherst, Massachusetts. In 1918, he became an aide in the division of reptiles for the Smithsonian Institution, working under Leonhard Hess Stejneger until 1920, when he became a zoology professor at the University of Michigan. In 1922, he published Amphibians and Reptiles of Western Tennessee. For the year of 1927, he took a sabbatical from the university to travel to New Zealand, Australia and Tasmania, primarily to study the tuatara. In 1935, he spent a summer with Howard K. Gloyd, travelling through the southwestern United States, writing a manual of the snakes of the US, which was completed by Gloyd after Blanchard's death. He also mentored young students, such as Laura Brodie. In 1936, Blanchard was elected vice president of the American Society of Ichthyologists and Herpetologists. His most enduring legacy to the field of herpetology is his techniques for studying live animals in the field.

In 1922, Blanchard married Frjeda Blanchard (née Cobb), the geneticist who first demonstrated Mendelian inheritance in reptiles.

== Taxa named in honor of Blanchard ==
Blanchard is commemorated in the scientific names of four taxa of reptiles (two species and two subspecies).

- Geophis blanchardi
- Lampropeltis triangulum blanchardi
- Opheodrys vernalis blanchardi
- Tribolonotus blanchardi
