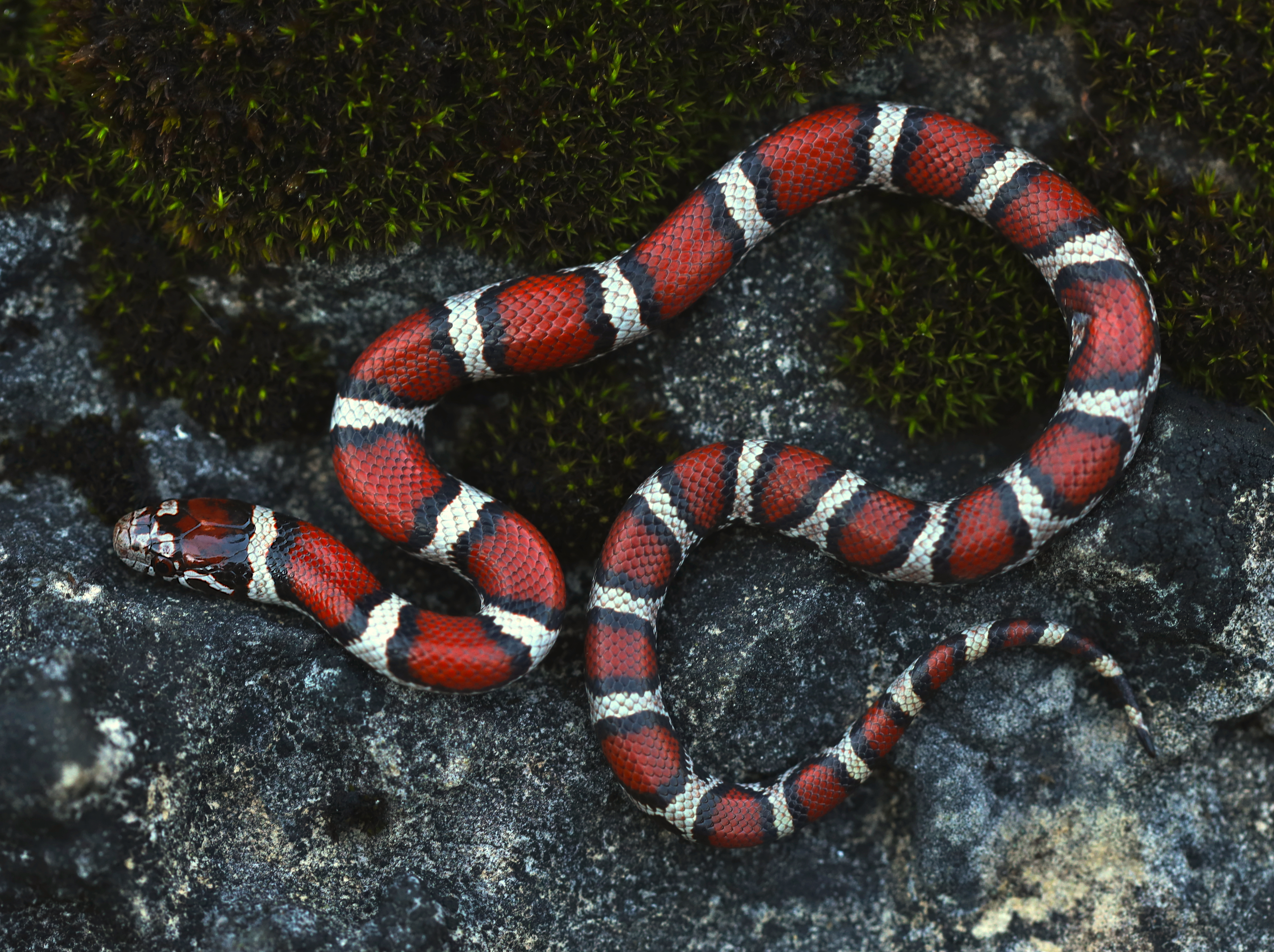
- Eastern milk snake (Lampropeltis triangulum triangulum)

Conservation status
- Least Concern (IUCN 3.1)

Scientific classification
- Kingdom: Animalia
- Phylum: Chordata
- Class: Reptilia
- Order: Squamata
- Suborder: Serpentes
- Family: Colubridae
- Genus: Lampropeltis
- Species: L. triangulum

Binomial name
- Lampropeltis triangulum (Lacépède, 1788)

Subspecies
- 24 subspecies, see text

Synonyms
- Coluber triangulum Lacépède, 1788; Pseudoëlaps Y Berthold, 1843; Ablabes triangulum — A.M.C. Duméril & Bibron, 1854; Lampropeltis triangula — Cope, 1860; Coronella triangulum — Boulenger, 1894; Osceola doliata triangula — Cope, 1900

= Milk snake =

Species of snake

The milk snake or milksnake (Lampropeltis triangulum), is a species of kingsnake; there were once up to 24 subspecies recognized, however fewer are officially recognized today. Lampropeltis elapsoides, the scarlet kingsnake, was formerly classified as a 25th subspecies (L. t. elapsoides), but is now recognized as a distinct species. The previously delineated subspecies have strikingly different appearances, and many of them have their own common names. Morphological and genetic data suggest that this species could be split into several separate species, and it has been by several authorities. Lampropeltis gentilis, Lampropeltis annulata, Lampropeltis abnorma, Lampropeltis polyzona, and Lampropeltis micropholis have been elevated to the species level. Milksnakes are not venomous.

== Geographic range ==
Milk snakes can be found from the southeastern extreme of Ontario, Canada, into southeastern Maine and all the states of the Eastern Seaboard of the United States of America, south to Florida, Alabama, Mississippi; from central Minnesota to Colorado, Nebraska, and the Dakotas; they are found in the foothills of the Appalachian Mountains; and in Georgia, Tennessee, Kentucky, Arkansas, Missouri, Kansas, Oklahoma, Texas and Louisiana. There are further subspecies found in nearly all of Mexico, from the state of Sonora east to the Gulf coast of Tamaulipas and throughout the rest of south and central Mexico; all through Central America and into Colombia and Ecuador.

== Habitat ==
Across the wide range of this species, habitat varies; typically, milk snakes prefer to live in forested regions or areas of open woodland. However, they can also be found in swamps, prairie, farmland, rocky slopes, some semi-arid/chaparral areas, and sand dunes/beaches. In some situations, milk snakes also migrate seasonally; during the winter, they may move to higher/drier habitats for hibernation, and then moister habitats in time for the summer. However, snake migration is often limited due to human-caused habitat destruction and fragmentation. Depending on subspecies, milk snakes enter hibernation from late October or November to mid-April.

== Description ==
There is a significant amount of variation among milk snakes in terms of size. Depending on subspecies, they can be as small as 14 in (36 cm) or as large as 72 in (180 cm) long. Adults in the wild apparently average from 38 to 225 g (1.3 to 7.9 oz) in North America. However, unusually large milk snakes can become rather bulkier than average-sized adults and potentially weigh up to 750 to 1,400 g (1.65 to 3.09 lb), though high weights as such are generally reported from captivity. Males typically are larger than females in maturity, although females can be bulkier than males similar in length as well. Generally more tropical populations, from Mexico and further south, reach larger adult sizes than milk snakes living in the temperate zones.

Milk snakes have smooth and shiny scales and their typical color pattern is alternating bands of red-black-yellow or white-black-red; however, red blotches instead of bands are seen in some populations. Some milk snakes have a striking resemblance to coral snakes, in Batesian mimicry, which likely scares away potential predators. Both milk snakes and coral snakes possess transverse bands of red, black, and yellow. Experts now recognize that common mnemonics that people use to distinguish between the deadly coral snake and the harmless milk snake are not 100% reliable. Some coral snakes do not have the typical banding colors or patterns. Examples of unreliable mnemonics commonly used:

- "Red on yellow kills a fellow. Red on black, venom they lack"
- "Red touches black, it's a friend of Jack. Red touches yellow, it's bad for a fellow."
- "Red, yellow, black... stay well back. Red, black, yellow... they're a friendly fellow"

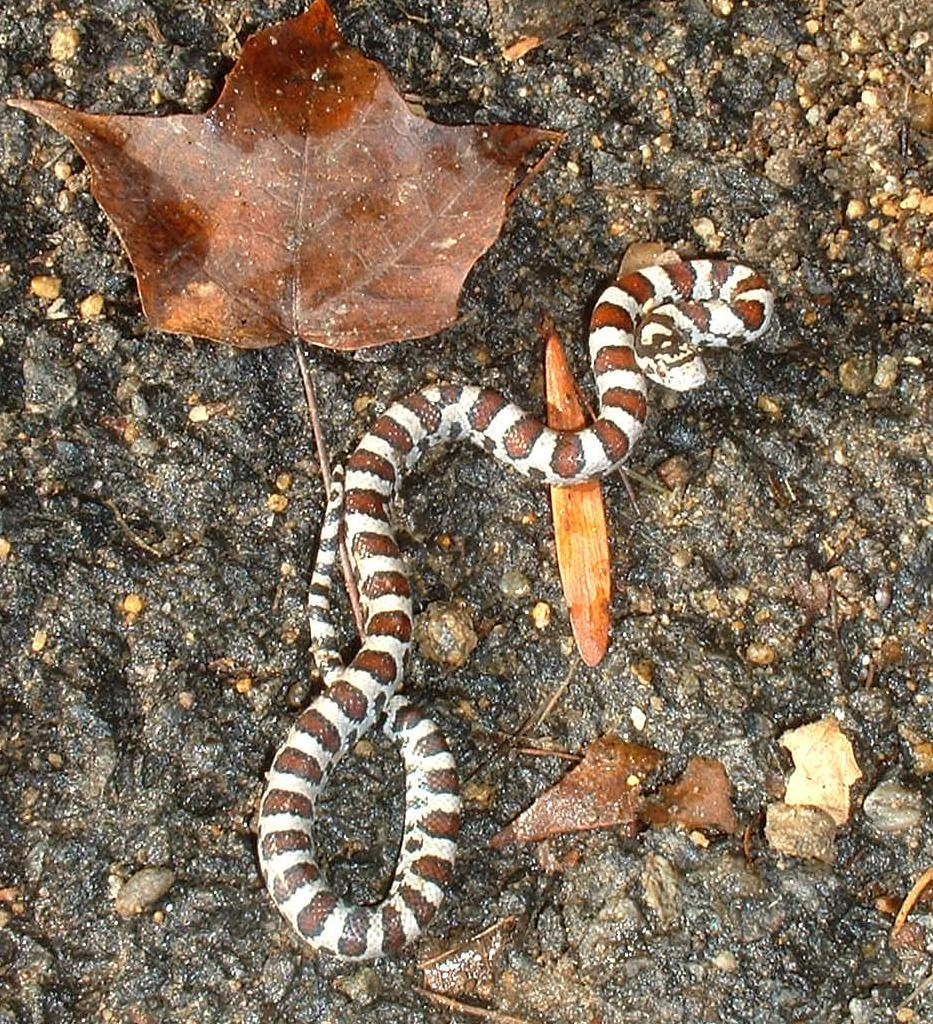
A juvenile eastern milk snake (L. t. triangulum)

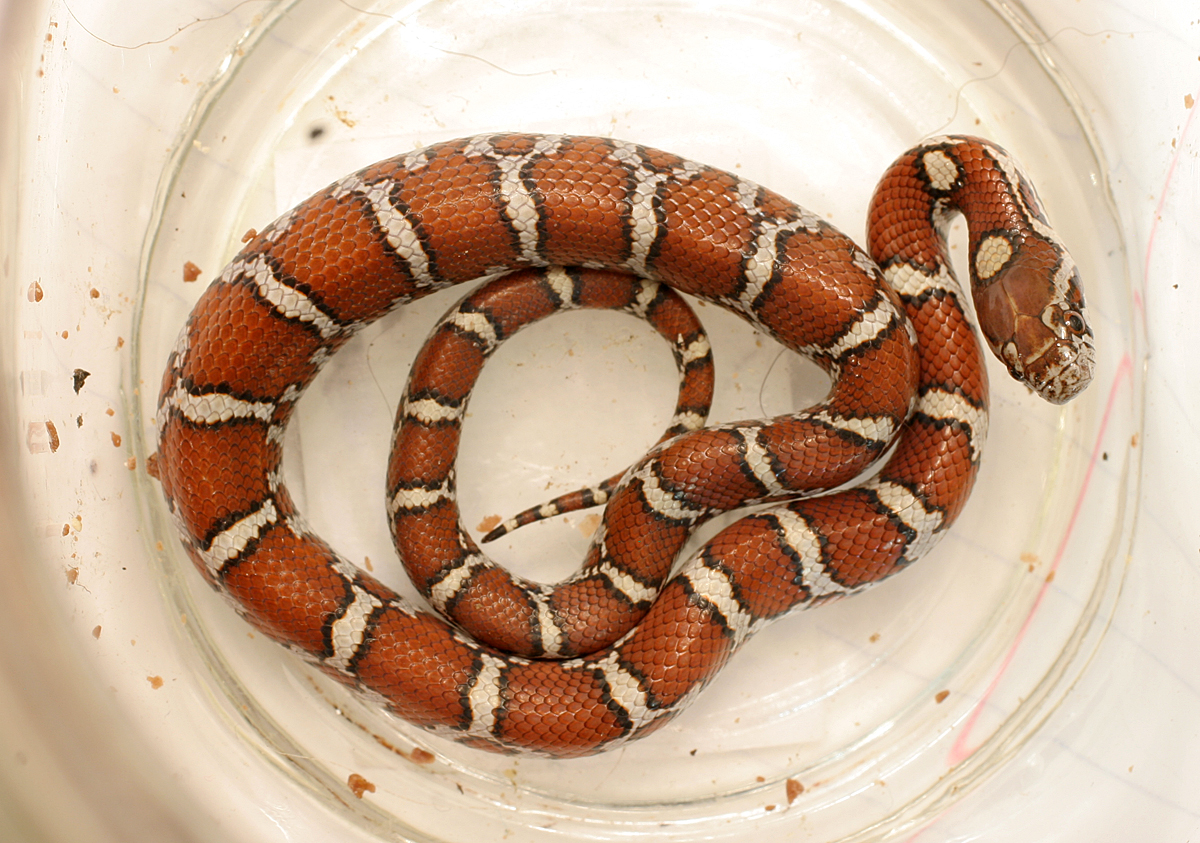
A young milk snake found in central Tennessee that has just eaten a lizard

Due to the many colors of the eastern milk snake (L. t. triangulum), it can resemble the coral snake, corn snake, fox snake, scarlet snake, and most importantly, the venomous snake genera Agkistrodon and Sistrurus. Milk, fox, and scarlet snakes are killed because of a resemblance to the venomous pygmy rattlers. Juvenile milk snakes, which are more reddish than adults, are often killed because they are mistaken for copperheads. Enough distinction exists among the five to make the eastern milk snake fairly easy to identify. The eastern milk snakes also have a light-colored V-shaped or Y-shaped patch on their necks. One subspecies, L. t. gaigeae, is melanistic (almost all black) as an adult.

== Behavior ==
Milk snakes are mostly nocturnal, especially during summer months. They are primarily terrestrial and attempt to blend in with ground litter. However, they are able to climb and swim. These snakes tend to be secretive and remain hidden. When threatened, a milk snake will usually first try to escape. If cornered or harassed, it may vibrate its tail and strike energetically, though they are non-venomous, have only tiny teeth and their tails lack a rattle. Unless frightened, milk snakes move slowly. They are often fairly docile.

== Diet ==
Young milk snakes typically eat crickets and other insects, slugs, and earthworms; in the western U.S., juveniles also feed on small lizards and other young snakes. Adults' diet is primarily small mammals (such as voles, mice, and rats), but frequently includes lizards (especially skinks). They are also known to eat birds and their eggs, frogs, fish, and other snakes (including venomous species like coral snakes and rattlesnakes) and their eggs.

Milk snakes are much more opportunistic eaters than the fox snake or corn snake. Although the diet of adult milk snakes primarily consists of rodents (such as voles, mice, and rats), they also have been known to consume a variety of other animals: birds and their eggs, other reptiles, amphibians, and invertebrates.

They are nocturnal hunters and are often found resting during the day in old barns and under wood. An old fable about milk snakes is that they suck cow udders to get milk. The story is entirely false, and is discredited by the fact that the milk snake is not physically capable of sucking milk from a cow's udder; however, milk snakes are frequently found in and around barns, making use of the cool and dark environment for a resting-place during the day, and the easily accessible infestations of rodents for a convenient food supply. This preference for barns, and consequently the company of cows, presumably gave rise to the fable.

== Reproduction ==
Milk snakes are oviparous, laying an average of about 10 eggs per clutch, although that number may vary by region. The milk snake mates from early May to late June. In June and July, the female lays three to 24 eggs beneath logs, boards, rocks, and rotting vegetation. The eggs are oval in shape, and white in color. Eggs range from 2.5 to 4.2 cm (0.98 to 1.65 in) in length. The eggs incubate for about two months, and hatch around August or September. The average hatchling in Virginia measures 20.9 cm (8.2 in) in total length and weighs 4.1 g (0.14 oz).

Milk snakes typically live around 12 years, or up to 21 years in captivity. They reach maturity within three or four years.

== Conservation status ==
The milk snake is listed as of least concern by the IUCN (a wildlife conservation union), but in some areas, they may face significant pressure due to pet-trade collection. Because of this species' attractiveness in the pet trade, many subspecies are now being bred in captivity for sale.

== Subspecies ==
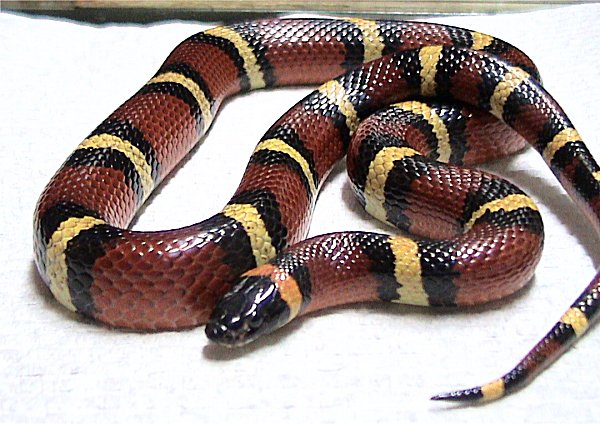
A Mexican milk snake (L. t. annulata)

- Guatemalan milk snake, L. t. abnorma (Bocourt, 1886)
- Louisiana milk snake, L. t. amaura (Cope, 1861)
- Andean milk snake, L. t. andesiana (K. Williams, 1978)
- Mexican milk snake, L. t. annulata (Kennicott, 1861)
- Jalisco milk snake, L. t. arcifera (F. Werner, 1903)
- Blanchard's milk snake, L. t. blanchardi (Stuart, 1935)
- Pueblan milk snake, L. t. campbelli (Quinn, 1983)
- New Mexico milk snake, L. t. celaenops (Stejneger, 1903)
- Conant's milk snake, L. t. conanti (K. Williams, 1978)
- Dixon's milk snake, L. t. dixoni (Quinn, 1983)
- Black milk snake, L. t. gaigeae (Dunn, 1937)
- Central Plains milk snake, L. t. gentilis (Baird & Girard, 1853)
- Honduran milk snake, L. t. hondurensis (K. Williams, 1978)
- pale milk snake, L. t. multistriata (Kennicott, 1861)
- Nelson's milk snake, L. t. nelsoni (Blanchard, 1920)
- Pacific Central American milk snake, L. t. oligozona (Bocourt, 1886)
- Atlantic Central American milk snake, L. t. polyzona (Cope, 1861)
- Sinaloan milk snake, L. t. sinaloae (K. Williams, 1978)
- Smith's milk snake, L. t. smithi (K. Williams, 1978)
- Stuart's milk snake, L. t. stuarti (K. Williams, 1978)
- Red milk snake, L. t. syspila (Cope, 1889)
- Utah milk snake, L. t. taylori (W. Tanner & Loomis, 1957)
- Eastern milk snake, L. t. triangulum (Lacépède, 1788)

Some authorities have elevated some of these subspecies to full species, and synonymized many of the remaining as follows:

- Ecuadorian milk snake, L. micropholis, incorporating L. t. andesiana and L. t. gaigeae
- Guatemalan milk snake, L. abnorma, incorporating L. t. stuarti, L. t. oligozona, L. t. hondurensis, and L. t. blanchardi
- Atlantic Central American milk snake, L. polyzona, incorporating L. t. arcifera, L. t. conanti, L. t. campbelli, L. t. smithi, L. t. nelsoni and L. t. sinaloae,
- Mexican milk snake, L. annulata, incorporating L. t. dixoni
- Western milk snake, L. gentilis, incorporating L. t. celaenops, L. t. multistriata, L. t. taylori, L. t. amaura (in part), L. t. annulata (in part), L. t. syspila (in part)

This interpretation leaves L. triangulum as only containing three of its former subspecies and occupying a greatly reduced range of near and east of the Mississippi River.

- L. t. triangulum
- L. t. syspila (in part)
- L. t. amaura (in part)
