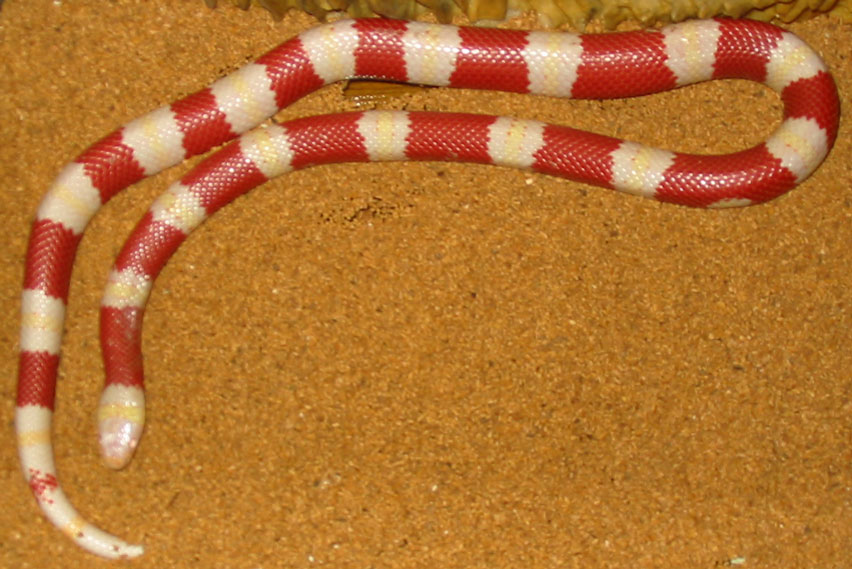
- Albino Nelson's milksnake, Lampropeltis triangulum nelsoni

Scientific classification
- Kingdom: Animalia
- Phylum: Chordata
- Class: Reptilia
- Order: Squamata
- Suborder: Serpentes
- Family: Colubridae
- Genus: Lampropeltis
- Species: L. triangulum
- Subspecies: L. t. nelsoni

Trinomial name
- Lampropeltis triangulum nelsoni Blanchard, 1920

= Nelson's milksnake =

Subspecies of snake

Nelson's milksnake (Lampropeltis triangulum nelsoni) is a subspecies of king snake that is found in Mexico from southern Guanajuato and central Jalisco to the Pacific Coast. It is also found on the narrow plains of northwestern Michoacán and on the Tres Marias Islands. The range of this snake appears to be tied to the proximity of watercourses, including ones utilized for irrigation and agriculture. It is a subspecies of the milksnake, Lampropeltis triangulum. It is similar in size to other king snakes, averaging 42 inches (110 cm) long, and like them, it is nonvenomous.

== Etymology ==
Botthe specific name, nelsoni, and the Common name, "Nelson's milksnake", are in honor of American ornithologist Edward William Nelson who worked for the U.S. Biological Survey from 1890, becoming chief in 1916.

== Size ==
Adults of Lampropeltis triangulum nelsoni average 42 inches (110 cm) in total length (tail included).

== Habitat ==
The preferred natural habitats of Lampropeltis triangulum nelsoni are semi-arid coastal thorn scrub and interior tropical deciduous forests.

== Diet ==
Lampropeltis triangulum nelsoni is an opportunistic feeder. It will eat birds, small rodents, lizards, amphibians, and other snakes, including venomous species. It has a natural tolerance to the venoms of many native venomous snakes.

== Appearance ==
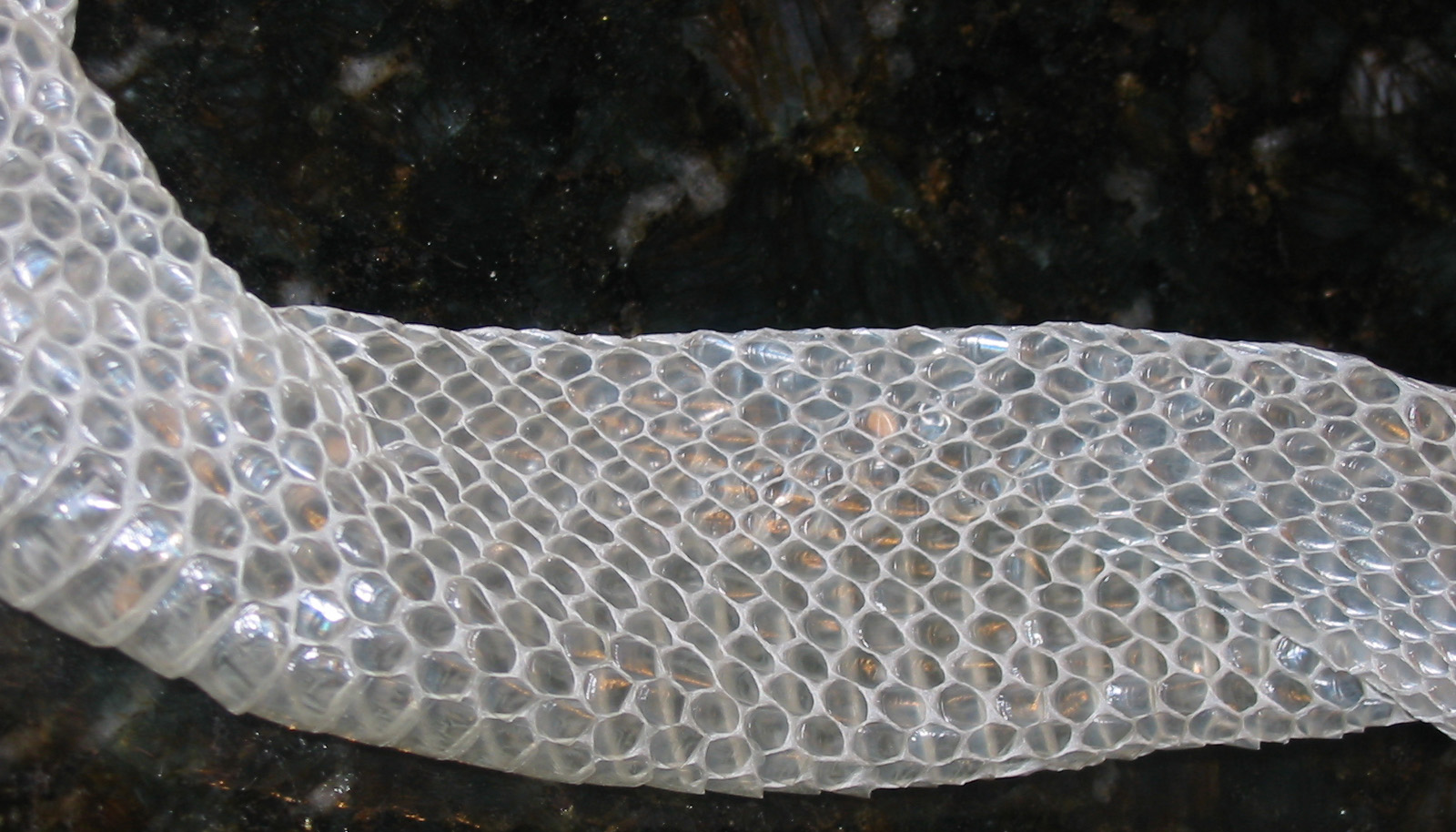
Moulted skin of an albino Nelson's milksnake with 21 rows of scales

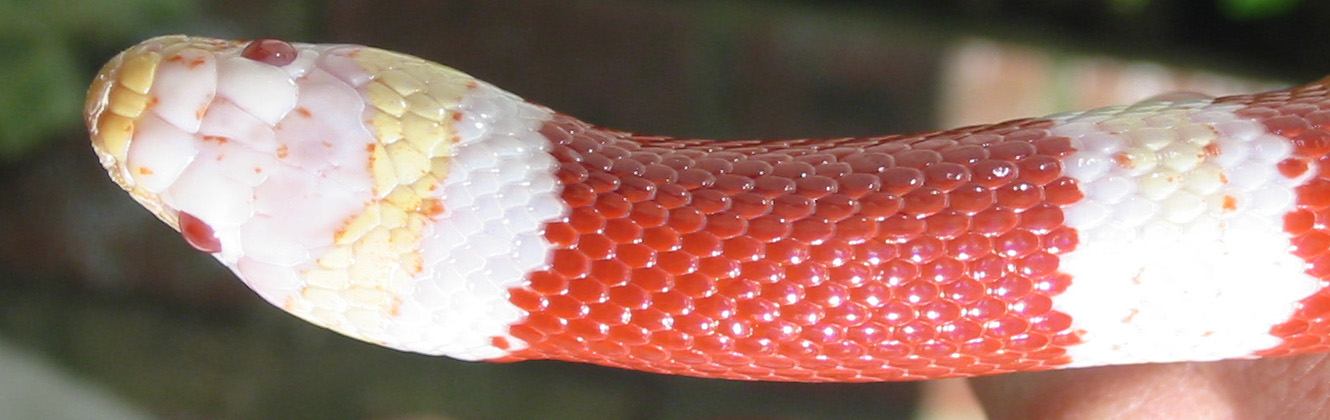
Head of an albino Nelson's milksnake.

Lamporopeltis triangulum nelsoni has 13 to 18 red rings and commonly has a dark-flecked light snout (in rare cases, the snout is mostly black). While the red bands are quite wide, the black ones are noticeably thinner, and the white is very thin. There is practically no black tipping on both the white and the red scales. Albinism and pattern aberrancies are established. It has 19 to 23 rows of smooth scales and a single anal plate.

Until noted by Kenneth L. Williams in 1978, it was not recognized that the L. t. sinaloae, or Sinaloan milksnake, found near Mazatlán, Sinaloa, Mexico, is a subspecies of milksnake distinct from the less common L. t. nelsoni.
