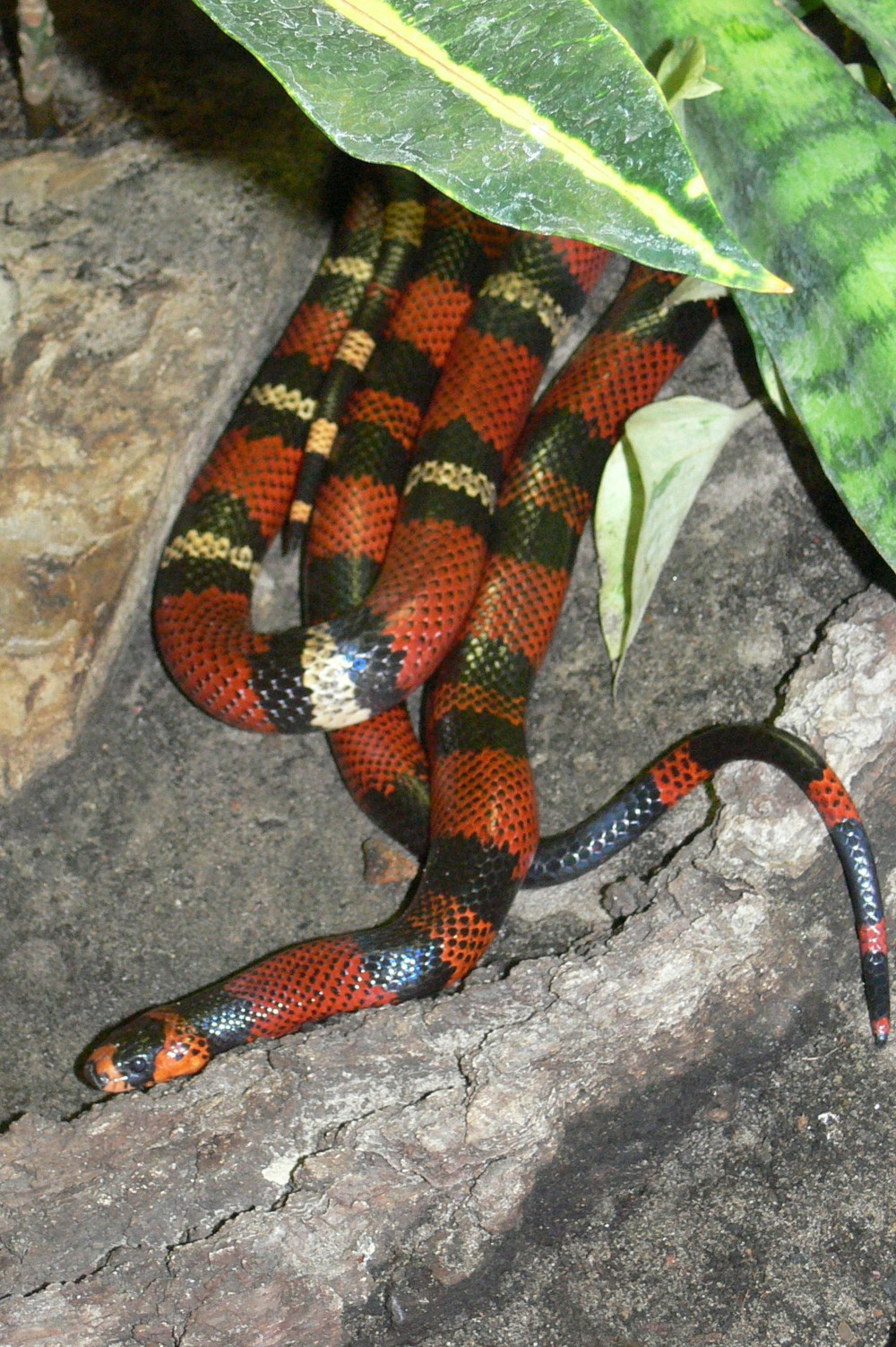
- Honduran milk snake

Scientific classification
- Kingdom: Animalia
- Phylum: Chordata
- Class: Reptilia
- Order: Squamata
- Suborder: Serpentes
- Family: Colubridae
- Genus: Lampropeltis
- Species: L. triangulum
- Subspecies: L. t. hondurensis

Trinomial name
- Lampropeltis triangulum hondurensis K.L. Williams, 1978

= Honduran milk snake =

Subspecies of snake

Lampropeltis triangulum hondurensis, commonly known as the Honduran milk snake, is an egg-laying subspecies of nonvenomous colubrid snake. It is one of the more commonly bred milk snakes in captivity and is one of the larger milk snakes, reaching a length of 5 feet.

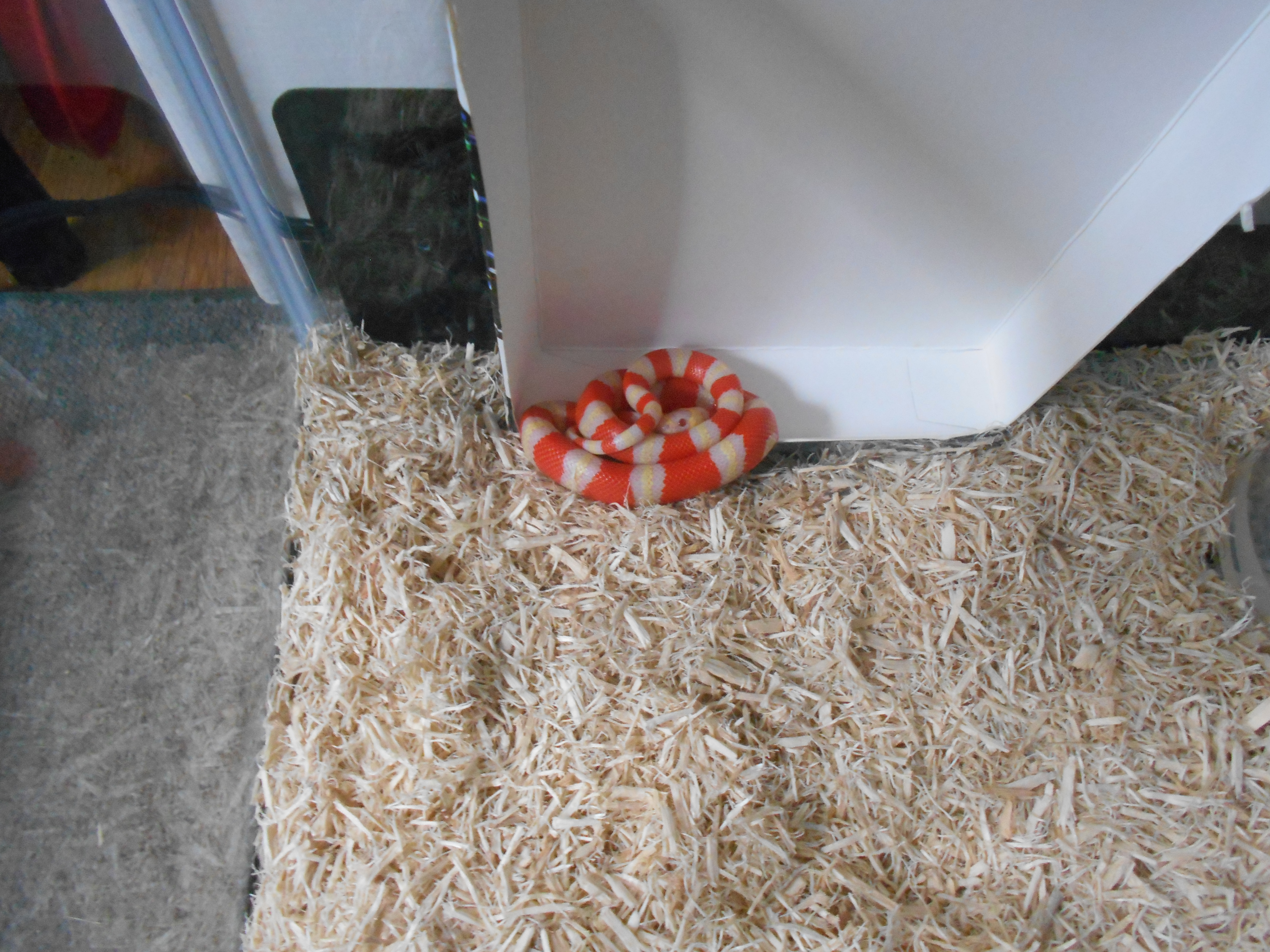
A two-month-old albino Honduran milk snake

== Taxonomy ==
The generic name (Lampropeltis) is derived from the Ancient Greek lamprós (λαμπρος) meaning "bright" and peltas (πελτας) meaning "shield", after the sheen of their scales. Its specific name (triangulum) is Latin for "triangle" and refers to the three colors found on the scales of the species (red, black, and yellow). Its subspecific name hondurensis is a Latinization of their primary country of origin: Honduras.

== Description ==
The Honduran milk snake's base color is red with distinct rings or bands of black and yellow. In some cases the yellow is actually a deep orange color and the animal in question is referred to as a tangerine phase. The Honduran milk snake is one of the larger subspecies of milk snake, attaining a length of 48 inches in the wild and some captive specimens reaching a length of 5 feet. The Honduran milk snake has a resemblance to the coral snake and this similarity in color, known as Batesian mimicry, helps protect the snake from potential predators.

== Habitat ==
The Honduran milk snake inhabits low to medium elevations of the tropical areas of Honduras, Nicaragua, and Northeastern Costa Rica.

== Diet ==
The Honduran milk snake uses constriction to kill its prey and tends to be opportunistic when it comes to its diet; they eat other snakes (ophiophagy), including venomous snakes, lizards, rodents, birds and eggs. In captivity they are kept successfully on a diet of mice and rats.

== Reproduction ==
Honduran milk snakes become sexually mature at 18 months. The females are oviparous, laying an average of 3–18 eggs per clutch in early June. The eggs incubate for approximately two months, and hatch in August or September. The hatchlings are 8 inches long and darker in color than their parents when they emerge from the eggs.

== In captivity ==
Honduran milk snakes adapt well to captivity due to their relative ease of care and docile nature, and their moderate size and brilliant colors make them impressive and attractive pets. Like all king snakes and milk snakes, they must be housed alone, apart from the breeding season, because they are cannibalistic.

=== Two-headed specimen ===
A two-headed albino Honduran milk snake (which are extremely rare) named Medusa was bought by record producer Todd Ray.
