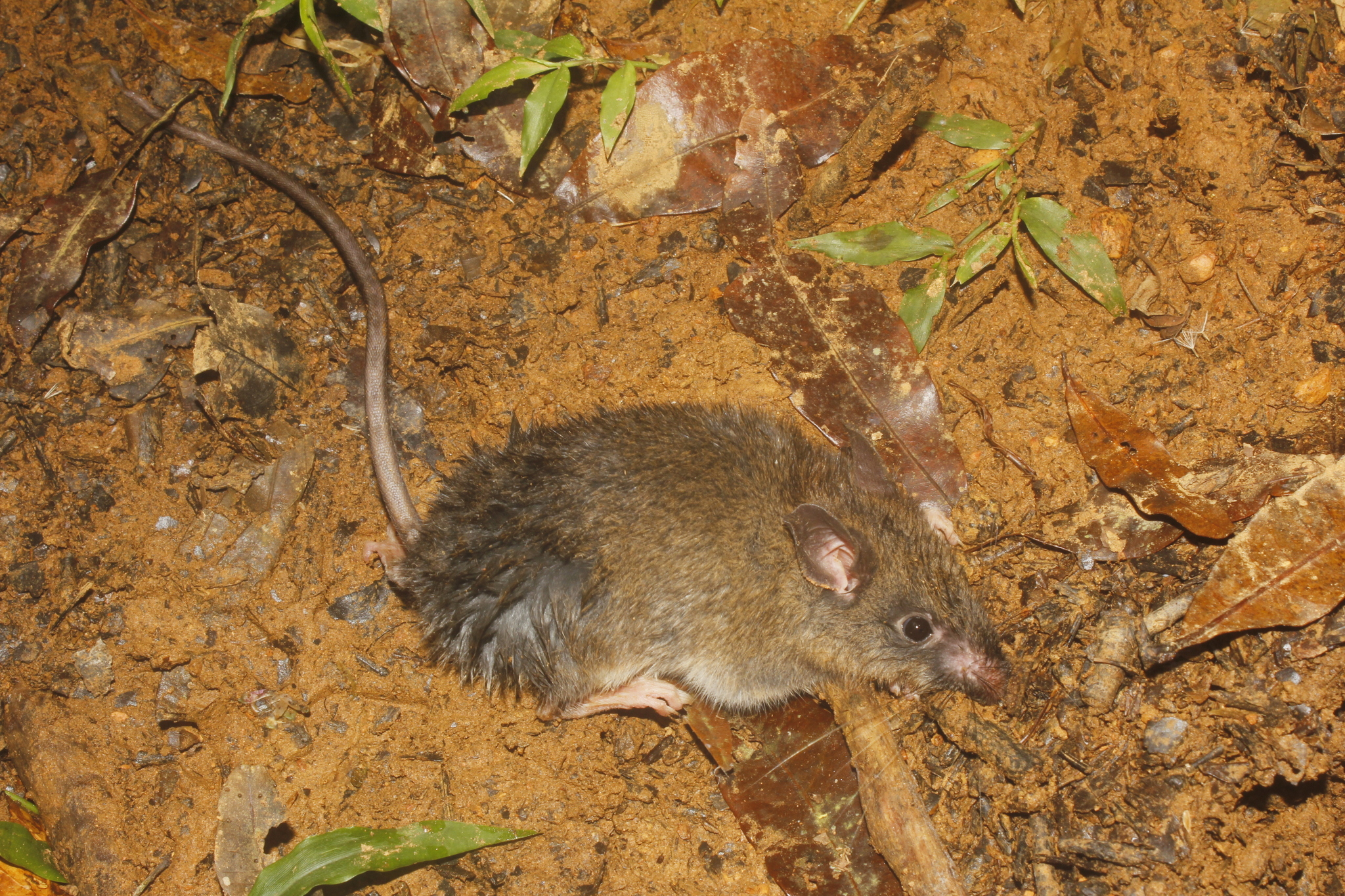

Conservation status
- Endangered (IUCN 3.1)

Scientific classification
- Kingdom: Animalia
- Phylum: Chordata
- Class: Mammalia
- Order: Rodentia
- Family: Cricetidae
- Subfamily: Neotominae
- Genus: Megadontomys
- Species: M. cryophilus

Binomial name
- Megadontomys cryophilus (Musser, 1964)

= Oaxaca giant deer mouse =

Species of rodent

Oaxaca giant deer mouse (Megadontomys cryophilus) is a species of rodent in the family Cricetidae. It is found only in Mexico.
