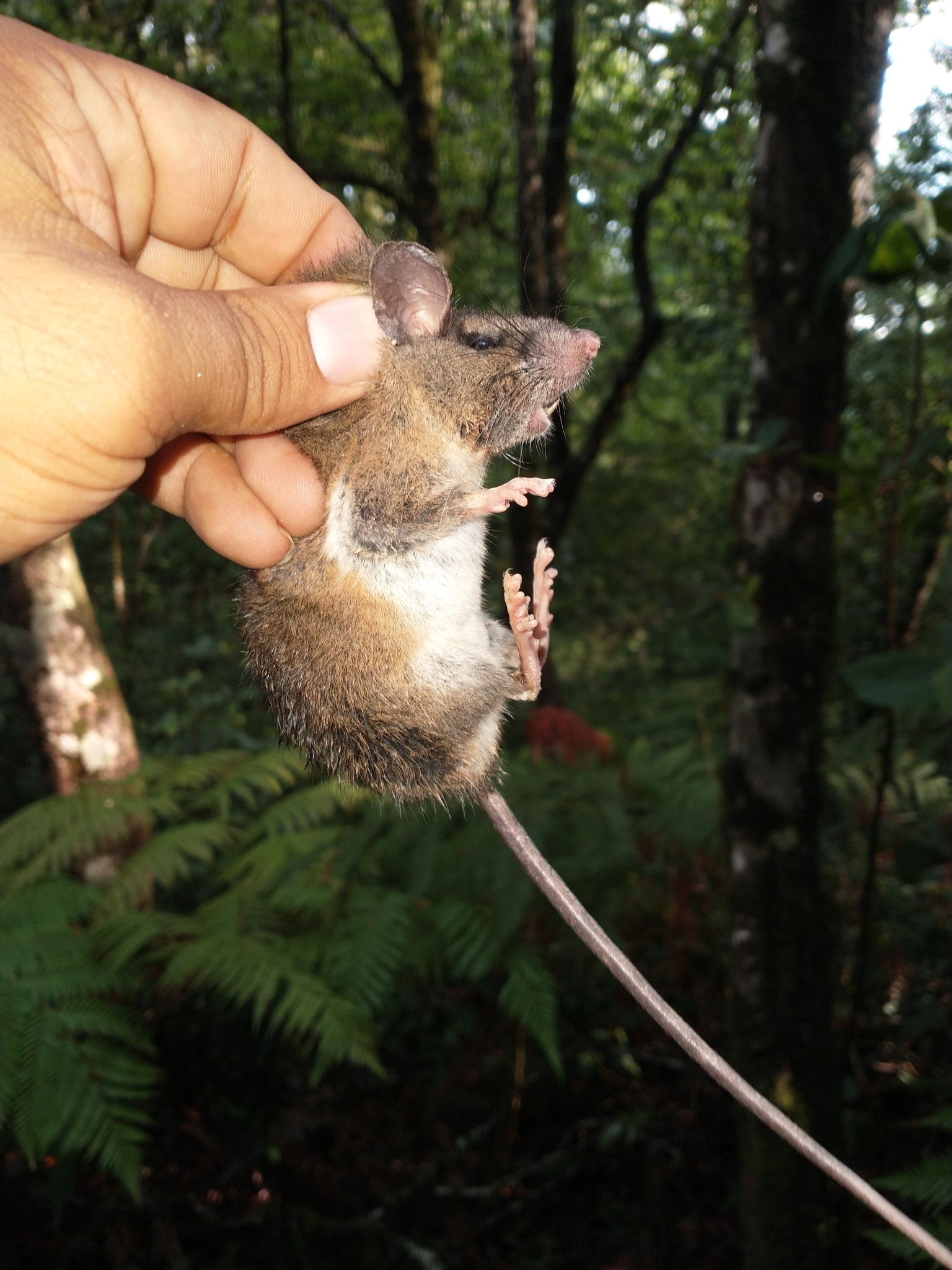
- Megadontomys nelsoni

Scientific classification
- Kingdom: Animalia
- Phylum: Chordata
- Class: Mammalia
- Order: Rodentia
- Family: Cricetidae
- Subfamily: Neotominae
- Tribe: Reithrodontomyini
- Genus: Megadontomys; Merriam, 1898

Type species
- Peromyscus thomasi

Species
- Megadontomys cryophilus Megadontomys nelsoni Megadontomys thomasi

= Megadontomys =

Genus of rodents

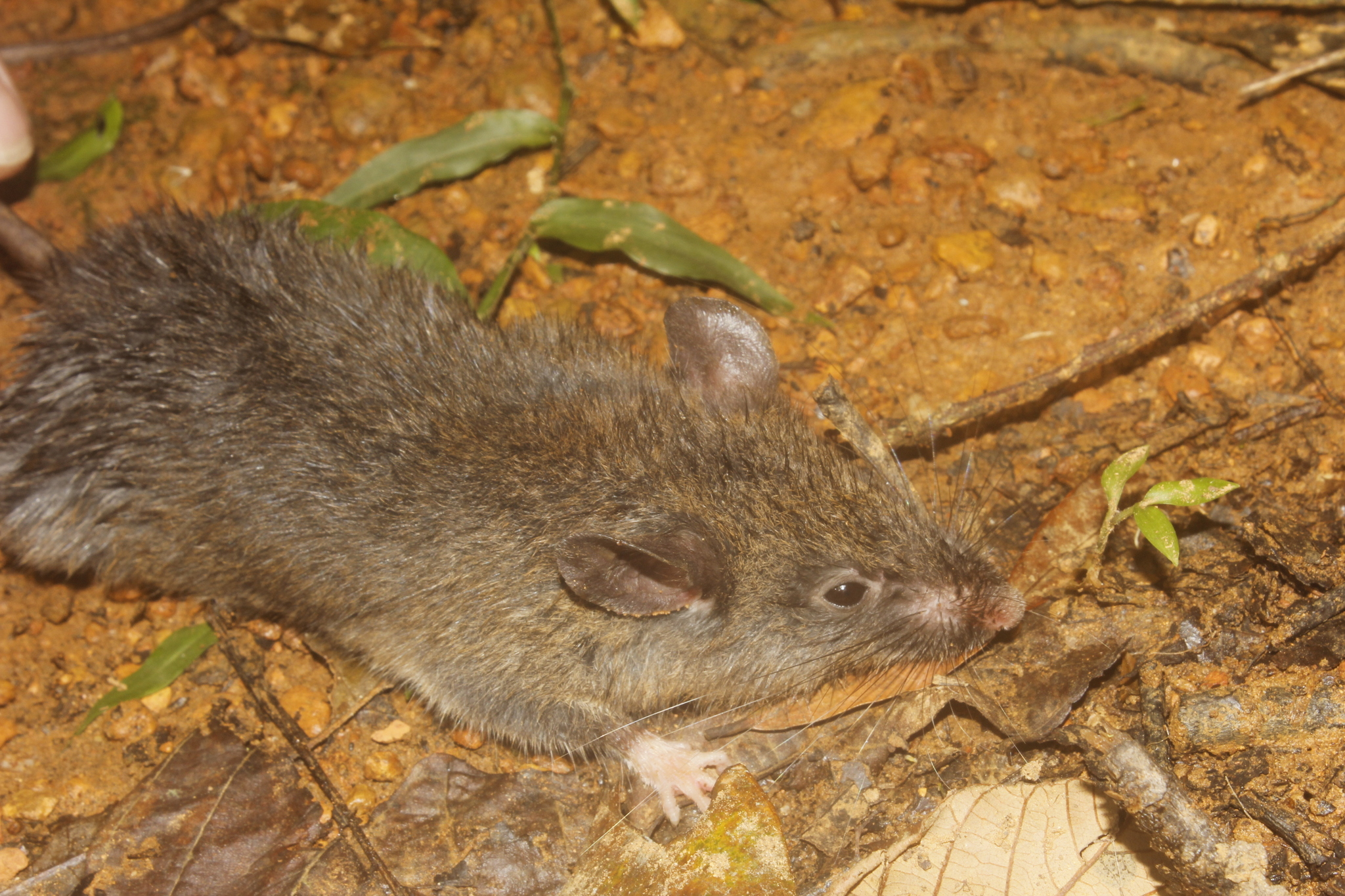
Oaxaca Giant Deer Mouse (Megadontomys cryophilus), Mexico.

Megadontomys is a genus of rodent in the family Cricetidae, found in Mexico. It contains the following species:

- Oaxaca giant deer mouse (Megadontomys cryophilus)
- Nelson's giant deer mouse (Megadontomys nelsoni)
- Thomas's giant deer mouse (Megadontomys thomasi)
