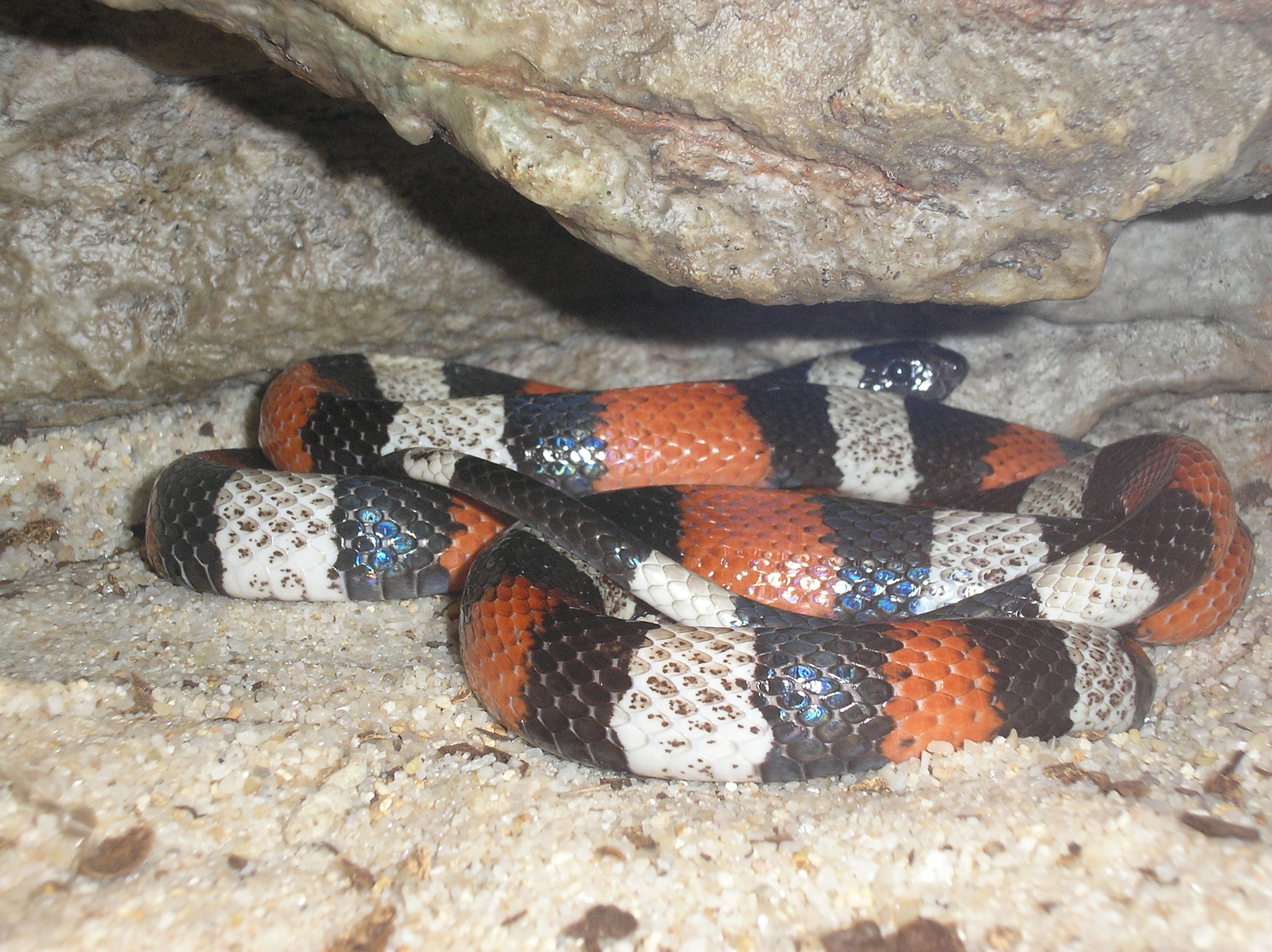
- Pueblan milk snake

Scientific classification
- Domain: Eukaryota
- Kingdom: Animalia
- Phylum: Chordata
- Class: Reptilia
- Order: Squamata
- Suborder: Serpentes
- Family: Colubridae
- Genus: Lampropeltis
- Species: L. triangulum
- Subspecies: L. t. campbelli

Trinomial name
- Lampropeltis triangulum campbelli Quinn, 1983

= Pueblan milk snake =

Subspecies of snake

Lampropeltis triangulum campbelli, commonly known as the Pueblan milk snake or Campbell's milk snake, is an egg-laying subspecies of non-venomous colubrid snake. It is commonly bred in captivity and is found in several color variations. When handled, it can discharge a pungent-smelling exudate from its cloaca as a presumed defense mechanism.

== Taxonomy ==
The generic name (Lampropeltis) is derived from the Ancient Greek lamprós (λαμπρος) meaning "bright" and peltas (πελτας) meaning "shield", after the sheen of their scales. Members of the Lampropeltis genus are closely related to the Pantherophis genus (Corn and Rat snakes). Its specific name (triangulum) is Latin for "triangle" and refers to the three colours found on the scales of the species (red, black, and yellow). Its subspecific name, campbelli, is a Latinization of the last name of American herpetologist Jonathan A. Campbell.

== Description ==
The Pueblan milk snake has a tri-color pattern of red, black, and white bands. Adult Pueblan milk snakes reach lengths of 24 to 36 inches. The Pueblan milk snake has a resemblance to the coral snake and this similarity in colour, known as Batesian mimicry, helps protect the snake from potential predators. They can be distinguished from other subspecies due to wide white bands, and frequent black tipping over the red bands. Also, the red in campbelli tends to be especially vibrant and bright compared to other subspecies. Non-morph Pueblan milk snakes always have pure white coloration on their light bands, save for some black speckling.

== Geographic distribution ==
The Pueblan milk snake is found in southern Puebla, eastern Morelos and northern Oaxaca, Mexico.

== Behaviour ==
Pueblan milk snakes are crepuscular, meaning they are most active at dawn and dusk. They tend to be flighty and nervous when disturbed by humans. They rarely bite unless provoked a large amount.

== Diet ==
Pueblan milk snakes will feed on anything they can overpower. They will consume prey such as mice, rats, birds, lizards, frogs, and other snakes, including venomous snakes.

== In captivity ==
Pueblan milk snakes adapt well in captivity if kept between 80 and 85 degrees Fahrenheit, with a night time temperature drop of 5 to 10 degrees. Temperature control is important, as it maintains the animal's feeding response and digestion. Cages should be escape proof, and fresh water provided at all times. A hide box is necessary, since Pueblans are more comfortable in confined spaces. King snakes and milk snakes must be housed separately (except during the breeding season) because they are cannibalistic. Pueblan milk snakes are widely bred and very affordable, likely being the most common subspecies in captivity.

They can be flighty and will typically defecate when initially handled, though they will rarely bite. They become more docile with regular handling.

== Reproduction ==
Pueblan milk snakes brumate for a period of 3–4 months from November through early March emerging to mate at the end of this time period. Females are triggered in this way to ovulate and produce a pheromone trail which the males follow. Pueblan milk snakes are oviparous and lay a clutch of eggs. The female lays 2-15 eggs 30 days after mating. The juveniles hatch 2 months (55–60 days) later.
