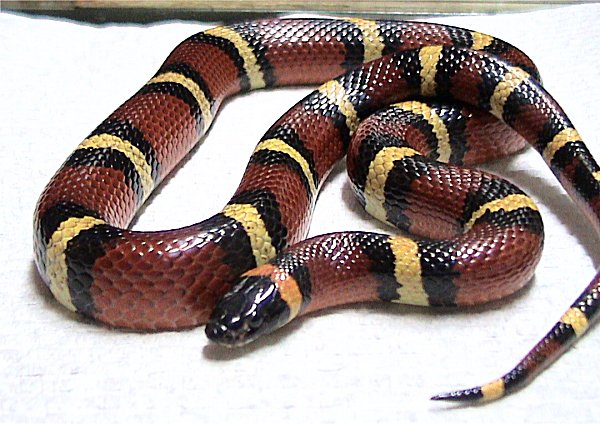

Conservation status
- Least Concern (IUCN 3.1)

Scientific classification
- Kingdom: Animalia
- Phylum: Chordata
- Class: Reptilia
- Order: Squamata
- Suborder: Serpentes
- Family: Colubridae
- Genus: Lampropeltis
- Species: L. annulata

Binomial name
- Lampropeltis annulata Kennicott, 1860

= Mexican milk snake =

Mexican milksnake

Subspecies of snake

Lampropeltis annulata, commonly known as the Mexican or Tamaulipan milksnake, is a non-venomous species of milksnake (family Colubridae). It is native to northwestern Mexico and some adjacent Mexico–United States border regions.

== Geographic range and habitat ==
This milksnake species is native to the dry, semi-arid regions of northeastern and north-central Mexico, predominantly the states of Coahuila, Tamaulipas and Nuevo León, and may additionally be found as far south as Guanajuato, Hidalgo, San Luis Potosí and Querétaro, and as far east as the coast of Veracruz. It may also be found as far north as southwestern Texas, United States, where it has been observed near cities as far north as Kerrville, Ozona, San Angelo and San Antonio, among others.

== Description ==
The Mexican milksnake has distinct red, black and cream or yellow-colored banding, wrapping around the body. This coloration is likely an evolutionary survival tactic to ward off potential predators by mimicking the venomous coral snake (Elapidae), which shares much of the same habitat, leading to the species sometimes being called a coral snake-"mimic." Localities indicate "whiter", brighter creams to the west, "dirtier" creams to the east and north, and often yellow or orange further south. The underside of the species is checkered black and white, in correlation to the overhead banding, with southern localities having higher concentrations of black, and northern localities having more white.

The subspecies can be differentiated from other milksnakes due to the darker light bands, which display at the very lightest—a creamy yellow color at the first light band following the black head (darker cream than other subspecies), with the rest of the light banding being solid cream. The darkest light bands will display: a bright yellow or orange-yellow color following the first light band adjacent to the black head, with the rest of the light banding being a lighter hue of either yellow, cream-yellow, or orange-yellow. Other milk snake subspecies may have darker light banding depending on the individual snake, and as described, the Mexican milk snake has a much higher prevalence of this trait and other distinctive features. The light bands are typically considerably larger than the black bands and broaden/widen towards the lower sides and ventral scales from the dorsal scales. Additional distinguishing features include all localities having red bands which are especially dark and crisp compared to other subspecies, with the red being around two or three times as wide as the black bands, and the red extending from the sides to the very edge of the ventral scales.

The Mexican milk snake is short in length and large in width compared to other milk snake subspecies, given that they grow to approximately 24–30 inches (61–76 cm) in length and have more girth overall. It is not venomous, contrary to the coral snake, which fairly resembles this milk snake. The coral snake's red and yellow bands are adjacent, while the milk snake's red and black bands are adjacent.

== Behavior and adaptations ==
Like many snakes, L. annulata tend to be nocturnal or crepuscular in lifestyle, mostly preferring to hide when the daytime temperatures are at their highest and becoming most active in the cooler periods of the day, especially from the spring to the fall. They eat primarily rodents and lizards; additionally, they will occasionally eat other snakes, including venomous rattlesnakes and coral snakes (albeit not nearly as often as the related kingsnakes), whose venom the genus Lampropeltis has (seemingly) evolved an innate resistance to. As with all lampropeltid snakes, they will eat most or all animals they can comfortably swallow, if hungry or voracious enough, including desert toads, frogs, young rabbits, and various ground-nesting birds and their chicks. Their choice of habitat is semi-arid brush areas with sandy soils. While these snakes are primarily nocturnal and crepuscular, as previously stated, they will also bask for short periods during the day to raise their internal temperature. If kept in captivity, they will appreciate being provided with a basking lamp set to a timer cycle.

Milksnakes, like many semi-arid reptile species, have a natural resilience and adaptability due to the many unpredictable climatic conditions and environmental pressures present in their habitats, which include predation, interspecific competition, drought and heatwaves, as well as seasonally-heavy rainstorms and potential flash-flooding. Depending on a snake's habitat's elevation and proximity to water, daytime temperatures in its range of northern Mexico and South Texas can vary, from temperate, albeit dry, throughout much of the year to oppressively hot in the summertime, easily reaching over 90°F (32 °C); on many days, the highs may easily reach over 100°F (37 °C) across the species' distribution. Contrastingly, winter lows can reach near-freezing, even experiencing snowfall in some areas. Snakes have evolved in response to such extremes, primarily by having a relatively slow rate of metabolism coupled with efficient digestion, extracting sufficient nutrients and hydration from their prey; when water is available, most snakes will readily drink it.

Breeding occurs on rainy spring evenings, and approximately 50 days later, the female will lay 4–10 eggs, which will incubate for 55–60 days before hatching. Newborns are around 6–7 inches (15–17 cm) long.

== In captivity ==
A pet Mexican milk snake adapts well to captive care and might appeal to owners seeking a small size and interesting coloration. They are generally docile and do not bite or stink.
