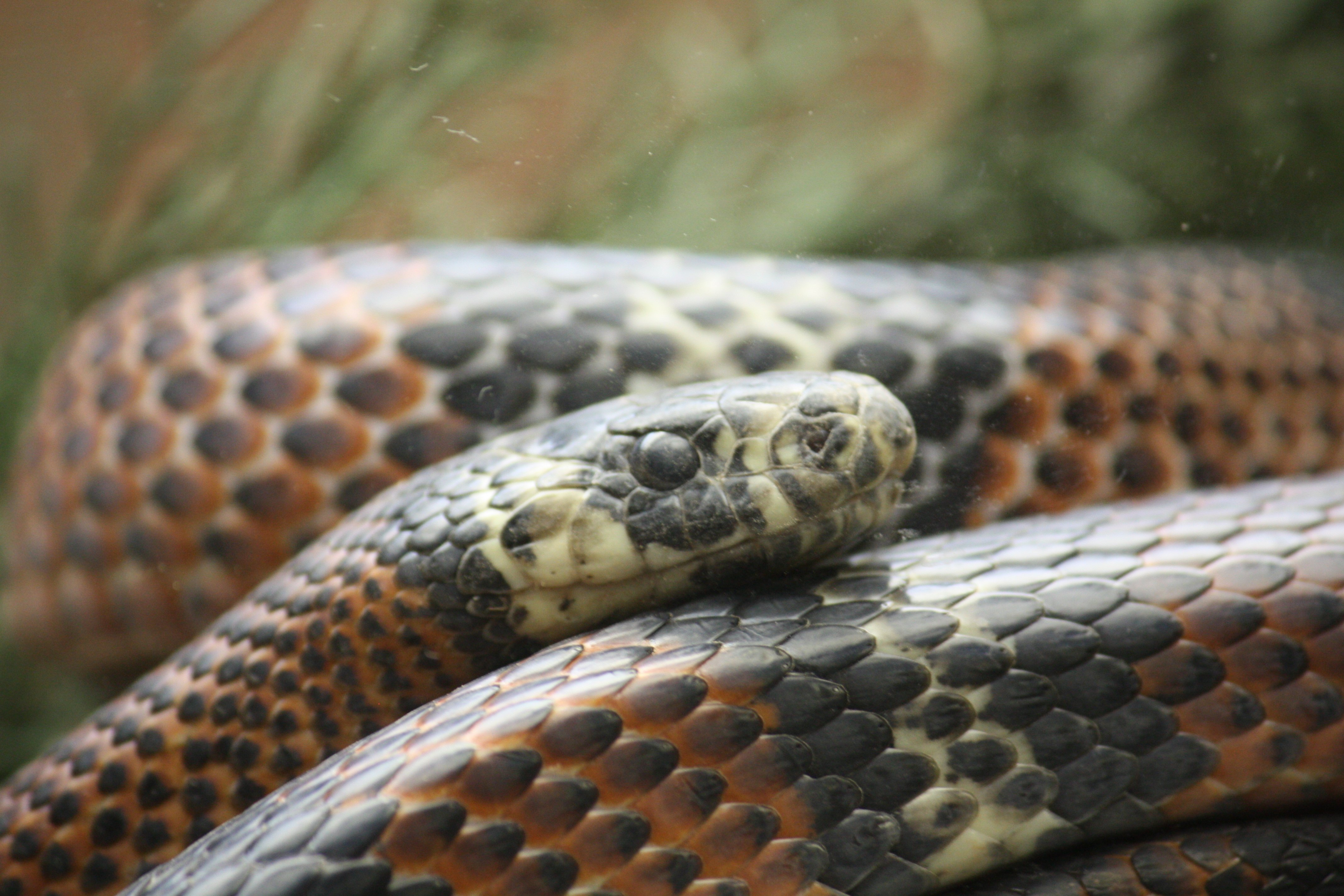

Scientific classification
- Kingdom: Animalia
- Phylum: Chordata
- Class: Reptilia
- Order: Squamata
- Suborder: Serpentes
- Family: Colubridae
- Genus: Lampropeltis
- Species: L. triangulum
- Subspecies: L. t. andesiana

Trinomial name
- Lampropeltis triangulum andesiana Williams, 1978

= Andean milk snake =

Subspecies of snake

Lampropeltis triangulum andesiana, commonly known as the Andean milksnake, is an alpine subspecies of milk snake.

== Description ==
These colorful snakes are covered in stripes of red, black, and yellow, often with black speckles on each scale. At up to 6 feet (1.8 m) long, this is one of the two largest subspecies of milk snake.

== Geographic range ==
Milk snakes range throughout the Americas, from Canada south to Ecuador. The Andean subspecies of milk snake occurs in the Andes Mountains of Colombia and Venezuela.

== Habitat ==
Andean milksnakes inhabit high altitude forests and grasslands, up to 9,000 feet (2,700 m) in elevation.

== Behavior ==
As mountain dwellers, Andean milk snakes can tolerate much lower temperatures than most snakes. They spend much of the time in burrows or under logs, where they are safe from predators and from cold weather. Milk snakes often come out of their dens in the afternoon or evening to hunt.

== Reproduction ==
Females may lay up to four clutches of eggs per year, with 12 - 20 eggs per clutch. Hatchlings are 8 - 10 inches long, but reach an adult length of 38 to 70 inches. The captive lifespan can be more than 15 years.

== Diet ==
Like all snakes, Andean milk snakes are carnivores. Young milk snakes mostly eat insects, while larger milk snakes eat small mammals, birds, eggs, amphibians, and other reptiles, including venomous snakes. Like most snakes, milk snakes only need to eat once every one or two weeks.

== Conservation status ==
Not listed on CITES or the IUCN Red List of Threatened and Endangered Species. Little is known about the wild population of Andean milk snakes, but they are thought to be common. These docile, colorful snakes are widely bred in captivity for the pet trade.
