= Neonelsonia =

Scientific classification
- Kingdom: Plantae
- Clade: Tracheophytes
- Clade: Angiosperms
- Clade: Eudicots
- Clade: Asterids
- Order: Apiales
- Family: Apiaceae
- Subfamily: Apioideae
- Tribe: Selineae
- Genus: Neonelsonia; J.M.Coult. & Rose
- Species: N. acuminata

Binomial name
- Neonelsonia acuminata (Benth.) J.M.Coult. & Rose

Synonyms
- Arracacia acuminata Benth.; Neonelsonia ovata J.M.Coult. & Rose

Species of flowering plant

Neonelsonia is a monotypic genus of flowering plants belonging to the family Apiaceae. It just contains one species, Neonelsonia acuminata, native to southern Mexico, Colombia, Costa Rica, Ecuador, Guatemala, Panamá, Peru and Venezuela. It is part of the tribe Selineae.

The genus name of Neonelsonia is in honour of Edward William Nelson (1855–1934), an American naturalist and ethnologist. The Latin specific epithet of acuminata is derived from acuminatus meaning tapering. The genus was first described and published in 1895. The species was first described as Arracacia acuminata in 1845, and transferred to Neonelsonia in 1898.
