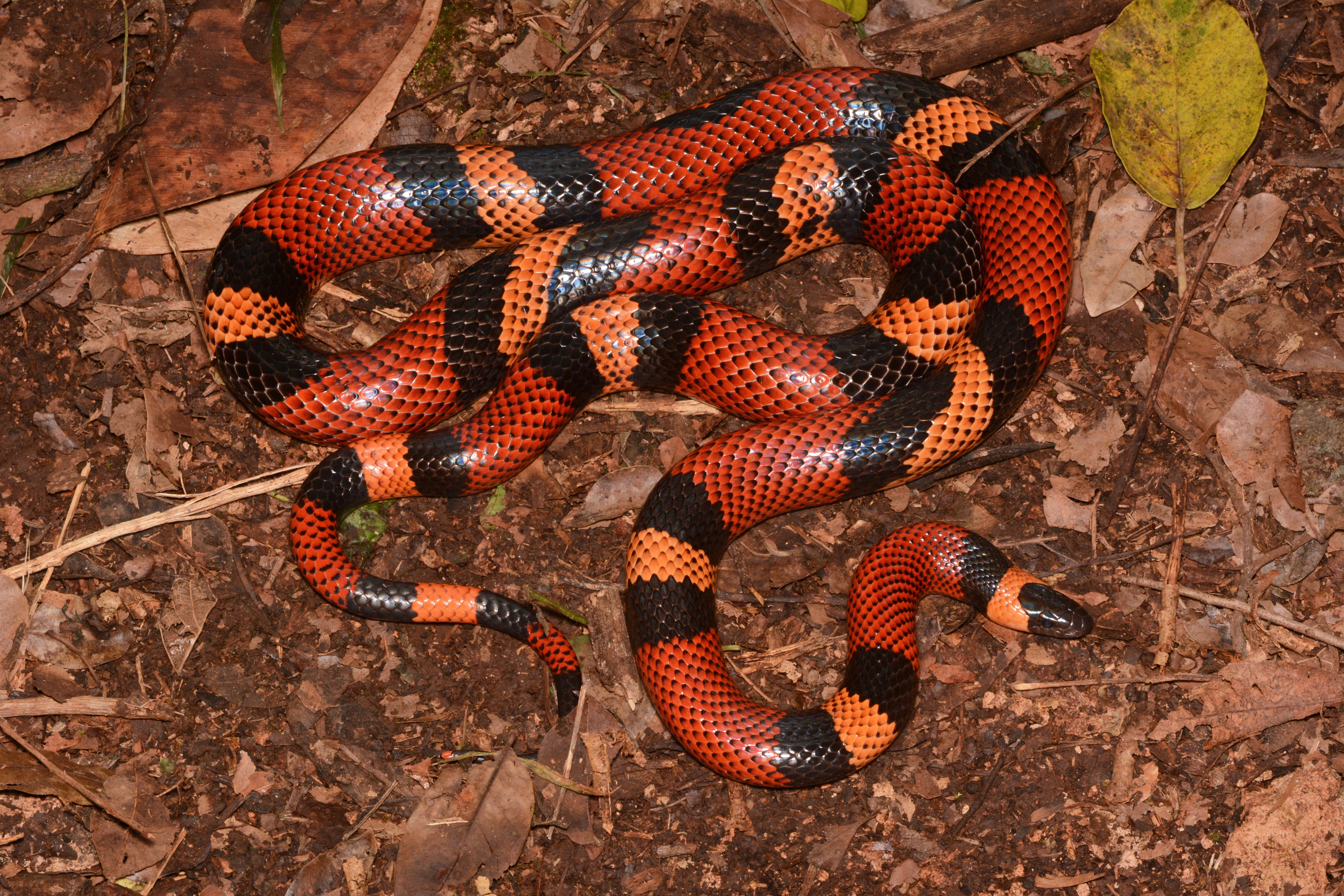

Conservation status
- Least Concern (IUCN 3.1)

Scientific classification
- Kingdom: Animalia
- Phylum: Chordata
- Class: Reptilia
- Order: Squamata
- Suborder: Serpentes
- Family: Colubridae
- Genus: Lampropeltis
- Species: L. abnorma

Binomial name
- Lampropeltis abnorma (Bocourt, 1886)

Synonyms
- Lampropeltis triangulum abnorma

= Guatemalan milk snake =

Species of snake

Lampropeltis abnorma, commonly known as the Guatemalan milk snake, is a species of milk snake.
