= Edward William Nelson =

American naturalist (1855–1934)

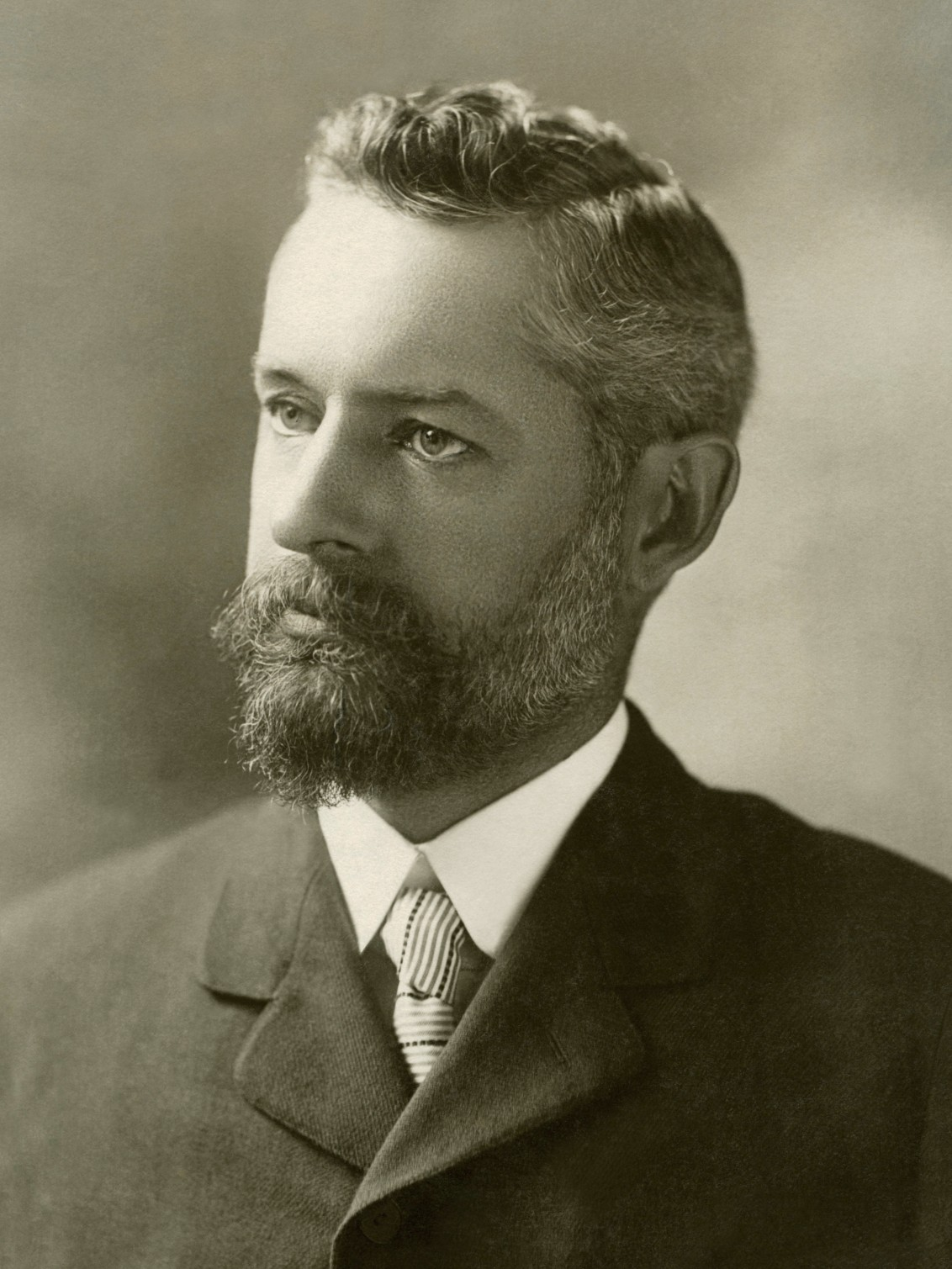
Nelson in the early 1900s

Edward William Nelson (May 8, 1855 – May 19, 1934) was an American naturalist and ethnologist. A collector of specimens and field naturalist of repute, he became a member of several expeditions to survey the fauna and flora. He was part of a team with Clinton Hart Merriam that took part in the Death Valley Expedition. He also explored the Yosemite Valley. A number of vertebrate species are named after him.

== Biography ==
Nelson was born in Manchester, New Hampshire, on May 8, 1855, the first son of William and Martha (née Wells) Nelson. Nelson and his brother then lived with his maternal grandparents in the Adirondacks when his father joined the Union Army and mother went to Baltimore as a nurse. Here he fell in love with the wilderness. Nelson moved to Chicago after his father was killed in the Civil War and his mother established a dressmaking business.

In 1871, his large insect collection was lost in the Chicago Fire and the family was left homeless. This was the time that he moved focus from insects to birds. He went to Cook County Normal School from 1872 to 1875 where the principal, W. W. Wentworth encouraged him. Nelson also met Henry Henshaw and Edward Drinker Cope who helped him develop his interests in birds.

In 1877. Nelson joined the U.S. Army Signal Corps. Spencer Fullerton Baird of the Smithsonian Institution was responsible for selecting Signal Officers for the remoter stations, and would choose men with scientific training who were prepared to study the local flora and fauna. Baird sent Nelson to St. Michael, Alaska. Nelson was the naturalist on board USRC Thomas Corwin, which sailed to Wrangel Island in search of the Jeannette expedition in 1881. Nelson published his findings in the Report upon Natural History Collections Made in Alaska between the Years 1877–1881 (1887). He also published his ethnological findings in The Eskimo about Bering Strait (1900).

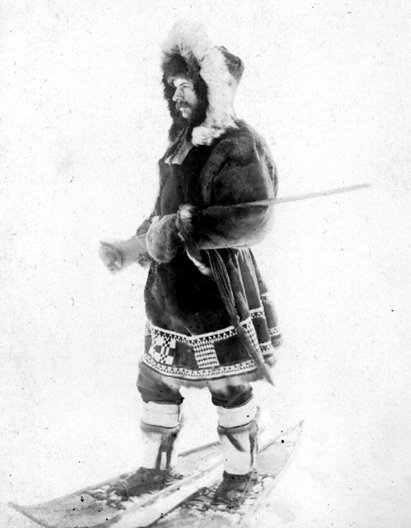
Nelson in Alaska

In 1890 Nelson accepted an appointment as a special field agent with the Death Valley Expedition under Clinton Hart Merriam, chief of the Division of Ornithology and Mammalogy, United States Department of Agriculture. After this expedition he was ordered to conduct a field survey in Mexico, and Nelson remained in the country for the next fourteen years. Nelson continued to work for the Bureau of Biological Survey until 1929, being chief of the bureau from 1916 to 1927.

== Taxa named in his honor ==
The desert bighorn sheep and Nelson's milksnake were named in his honor. The holotype of the milksnake was collected by Nelson and Edward Alphonso Goldman on July 18, 1897. He worked with Goldman for ten years surveying Mexican terrestrial vertebrates. Nelson's sparrow (Ammospiza nelsoni) (formerly Nelson's sharp-tailed sparrow; formerly sharp-tailed sparrow) was also named after him. Rodents named in his honor include Ammospermophilus nelsoni, Chaetodipus nelsoni, Dicrostonyx nelsoni, Dipodomys nelsoni, Heteromys nelsoni, Megadontomys nelsoni, Neotoma nelsoni, Oryzomys nelsoni, Xenomys nelsoni, and the genus Nelsonia. The shrew Cryptotis nelsoni is also named after Nelson.

In addition to Nelson's milksnake, four other reptiles are named in his honor: Nelson's anole, Nelson's tree lizard, Nelson's spiny lizard, and Nelson's spotted box turtle. He was the president of the American Society of Mammalogists from 1921 to 1923. He also served as president of the American Ornithologists' Union and the Biological Society of Washington. He never married.

In 1895, botanists J.M.Coult. & Rose published Neonelsonia, a monotypic genus of flowering plant from South America, belonging to the family Apiaceae. Then in 1973, botanists H.Rob. & Brettell published Nelsonianthus, a genus of flowering plants from Mexico and Guatemala belonging to the family Asteraceae, also named in Nelson's honour.

== See also ==
- European and American voyages of scientific exploration

== Taxa described by him ==
- See Category:Taxa named by Edward William Nelson
