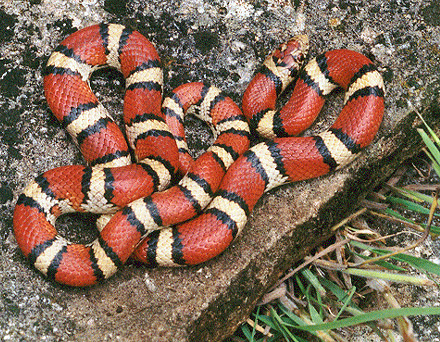
- An adult red milk snake

Scientific classification
- Kingdom: Animalia
- Phylum: Chordata
- Class: Reptilia
- Order: Squamata
- Suborder: Serpentes
- Family: Colubridae
- Genus: Lampropeltis
- Species: L. triangulum
- Subspecies: L. t. syspila

Trinomial name
- Lampropeltis triangulum syspila Cope, 1889

= Red milk snake =

Subspecies of snake

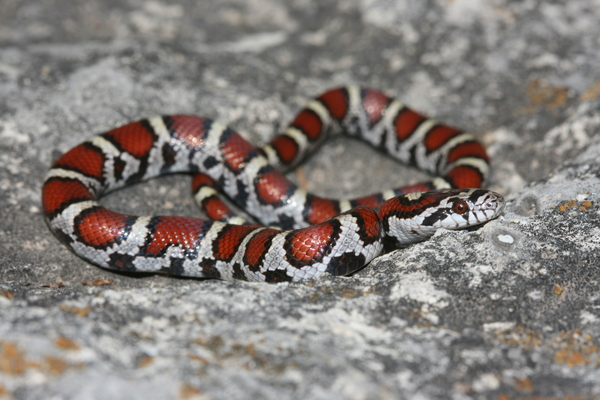
Red milk snake from Madison County, Iowa

Lampropeltis triangulum syspila, commonly known as the red milk snake or red milksnake, is a subspecies of the milk snake (Lampropeltis triangulum). The nonvenomous, colubrid snake is indigenous to the central United States.

== Geographic range ==
The red milk snake is found from southern Indiana through northwestern Mississippi, western Kentucky, southeastern South Dakota through eastern Oklahoma and Kansas. An isolated population can be found in Bankhead National Forest in northwestern Alabama.

== Description ==
Red milk snakes average 60–91 centimeters (24–36 inches) in length, although specimens as long as 132 centimeters (52 inches) have been measured. They have smooth and shiny scales. Their dorsal color pattern is narrow bands of white, pale gray, cream, or tan bordered by black, alternated with red dorsal saddles. Some individuals display even greater dorsal saddle color diversity, ranging from reddish brown to grayish brown. The ventrum is usually white with a black checkered pattern. The head usually has a large red blotch edged in black.

== Diet ==
Red milk snakes are constrictors. They consume a variety of small rodents and reptiles (especially lizards).
