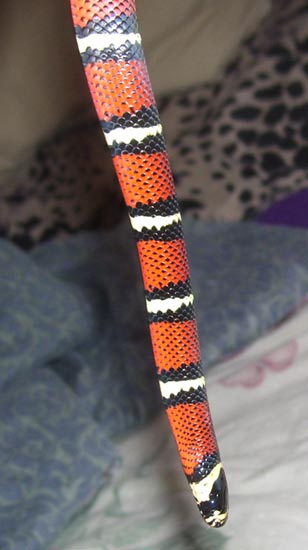
- Hatchling black milk snake

Scientific classification
- Kingdom: Animalia
- Phylum: Chordata
- Class: Reptilia
- Order: Squamata
- Suborder: Serpentes
- Family: Colubridae
- Genus: Lampropeltis
- Species: L. triangulum
- Subspecies: L. t. gaigeae

Trinomial name
- Lampropeltis triangulum gaigeae [[[Edward Reid Dunn|Dunn]]], 1937

= Black milk snake =

Subspecies of snake

Lampropeltis triangulum gaigeae, commonly known as the black milk snake, is a non-venomous subspecies of milk snake. It is the largest known milk snake subspecies. Black milk snakes are found in the mountains of Costa Rica and Panama.

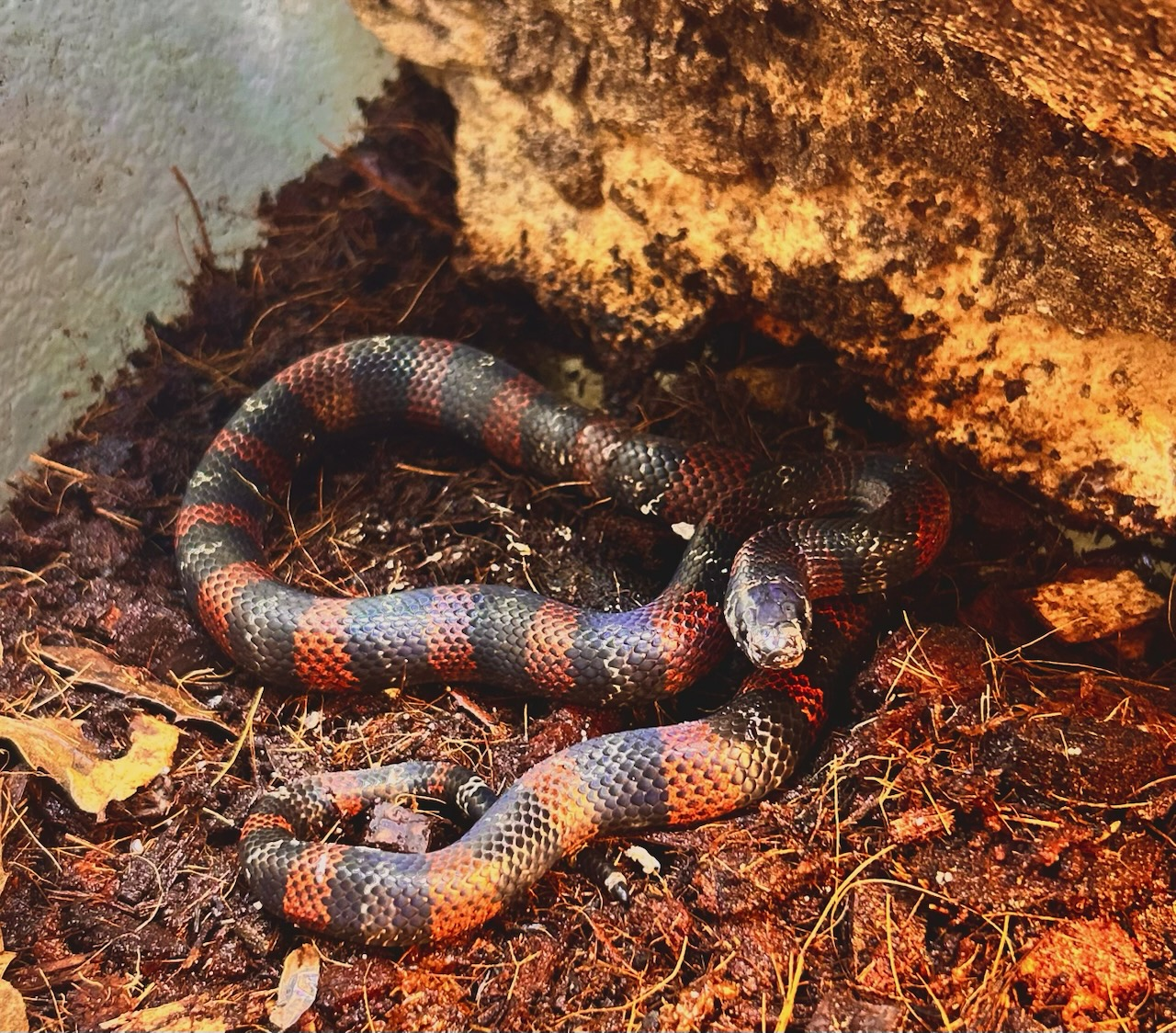
Black milk snake yearling under log.

== Description ==
Hatchling black milk snakes are between 12 and 16 inches in length. They are red, black, and white or yellow as hatchlings. When they are between 6 and 10 months of age, the black milk snakes undergo an ontogenetic colour change; Melanogenesis (production of the melanin pigments; often produced by cells called melanocytes), which gives these snakes a darker shade as they grow to adulthood, and eventually turns them pure black once 2.5–3 years old, hence their name. Adult black milk snakes average between 48 and 76 inches (4 feet – 6 feet 4 inches), but some have been known to grow up to 7 feet in length.

== Taxonomy ==
Black milk snakes were first described by Emmett Reid Dunn, in 1937, based on specimens collected in 1923 at Boquete, Chiriquí, Panama by Helen and Charles Gaige, for whom the subspecies was named. Dunn originally described the species as gaigae, but it was later changed to gigeae to properly reflect Gaige's name while conforming to taxonomic naming rules. It is unclear who created the common name "black milk snake", but it is seen in reptilian literature in the late 20th century.

== Geographic range ==
Black milk snakes are native to Costa Rica and Panama. They typically live in the wet, high mountain cloud forests at elevations between 5,000 and 7,400 feet in Costa Rica, and between 4,300–6,500 feet in Panama. Unlike many cloud forest dwelling snakes, Black milk snakes are semi-fossorial and primarily found hiding under logs and rocks, or buried 1-4 inches under the ground.

== Diet ==
Black milk snakes are opportunistic hunters, but typically eat mice, reptiles, amphibians, invertebrates, reptile eggs, birds, and bird eggs in the wild.

== Captivity ==
Black milk snakes can make excellent pets for many people. They are typically very hardy snakes in captivity. As hatchlings they will readily accept mice, and as adults may consume medium-sized rats. Since they dwell in high elevations in the wild, they do well with their temperatures between 72 and 78 degrees Fahrenheit. If they are kept at temperatures between 80 - 85 degrees, they metabolize their food much more quickly than other colubrids, and can become overweight very easily, along with becoming stressed. Because these snakes are found in cloud forests, they prefer very high humidity (60-80%)

== Thermoregulation ==
Black milk snakes exhibit thermoconforming behavior, which means they allow their internal body temperature to fluctuate, even when environmental temperatures are below 75 °F (24 °C). While many other milk snake species use basking to maintain metabolic activity and digestion, black milk snakes thrive in stable, cool conditions found in cloud forests.
