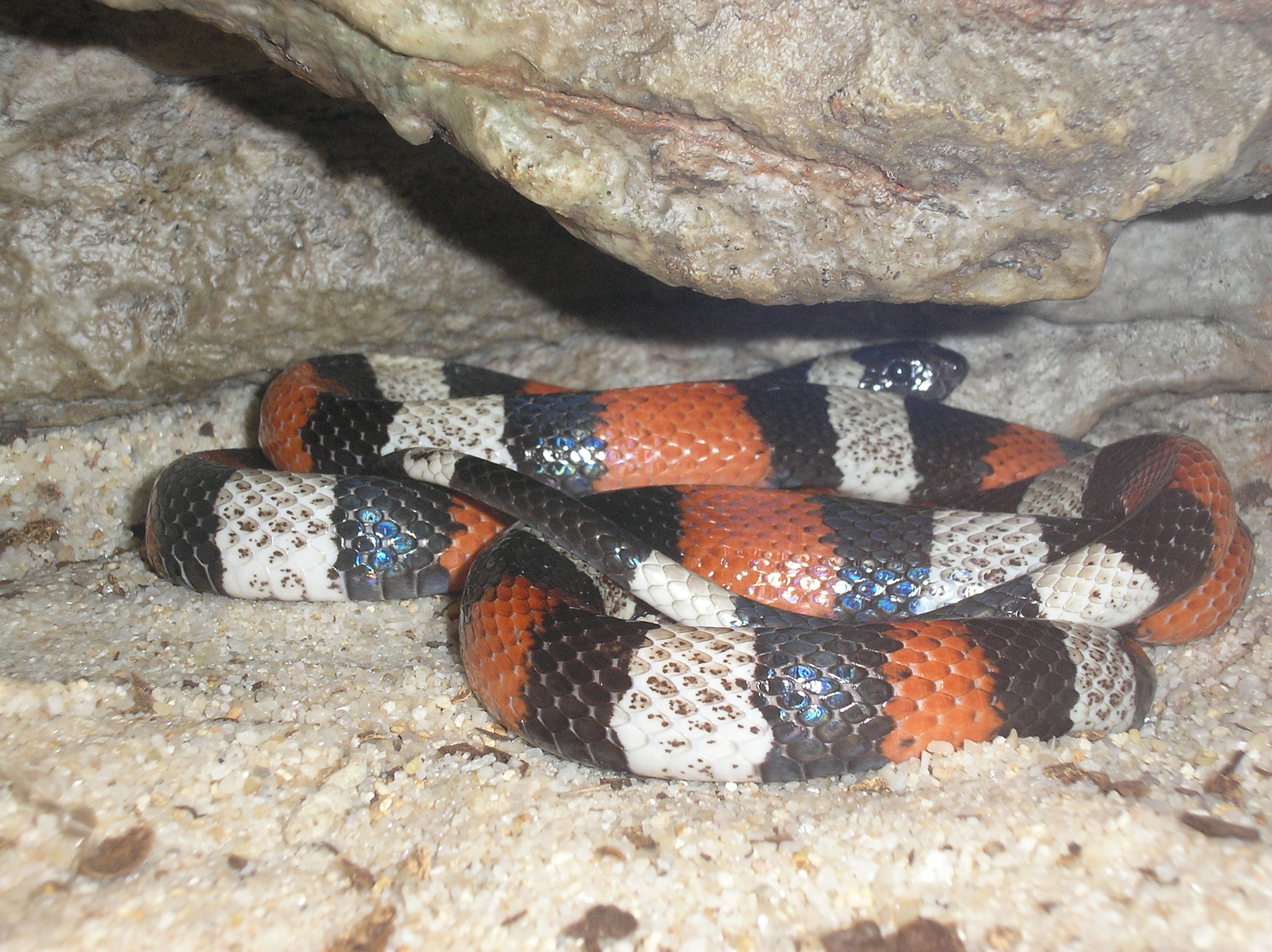

Conservation status
- Least Concern (IUCN 3.1)

Scientific classification
- Kingdom: Animalia
- Phylum: Chordata
- Class: Reptilia
- Order: Squamata
- Suborder: Serpentes
- Family: Colubridae
- Genus: Lampropeltis
- Species: L. micropholis

Binomial name
- Lampropeltis micropholis Cope, 1860

= Lampropeltis micropholis =

Ecuadorian milk snake

Species of snake

Lampropeltis micropholis, commonly known as the Ecuadorian milk snake, is a species of milk snake.

It is found in Colombia, Costa Rica, Ecuador, Panama and possibly Venezuela.
