= Pygmy rattler =

Pygmy rattler is a common name for two species of snakes:

- Sistrurus miliarius, a.k.a. the pigmy rattlesnake, a venomous pitviper found in North America
- Sistrurus catenatus, a.k.a. the massasauga, another venomous pitviper found in North America
