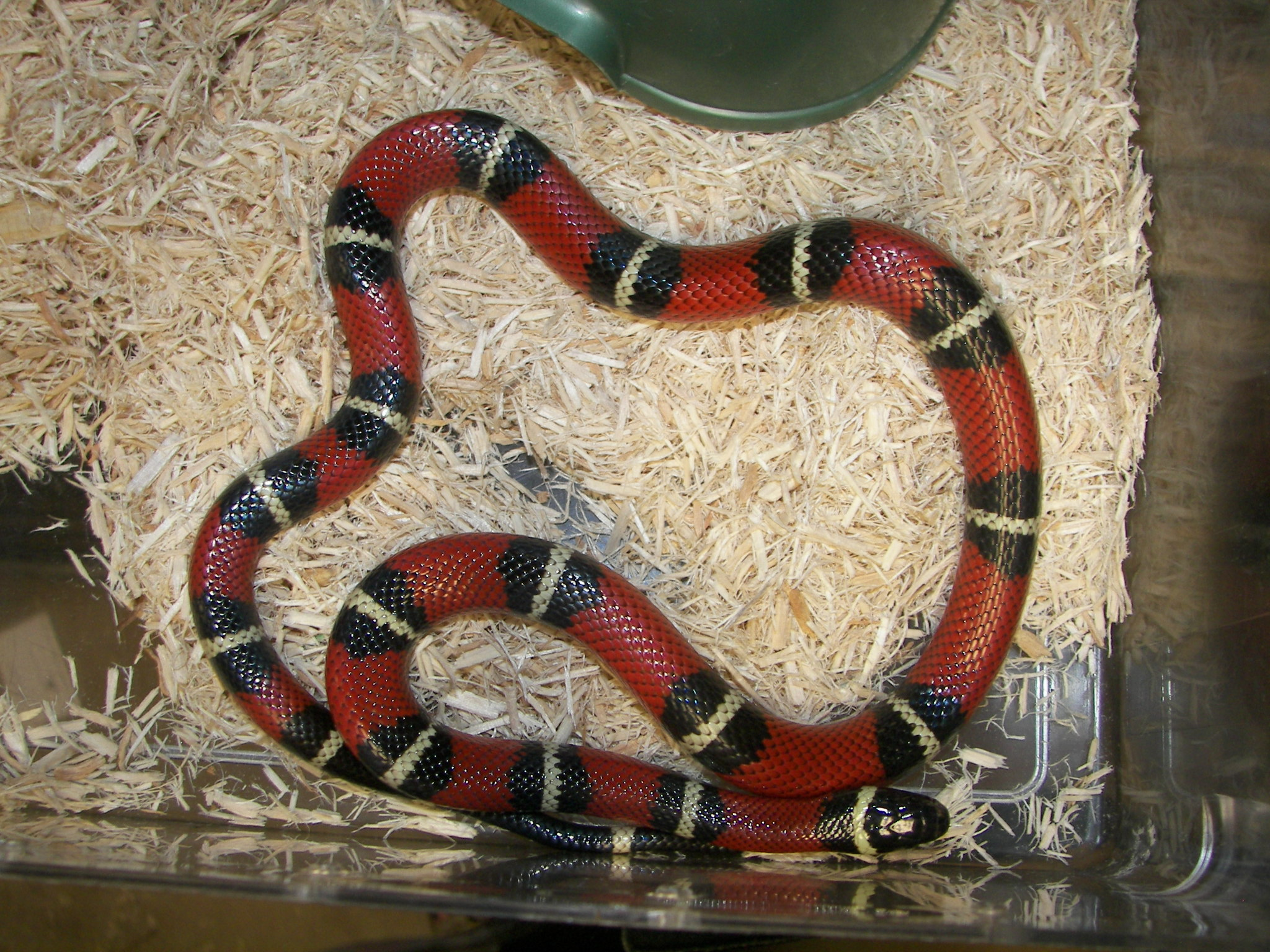

Conservation status
- Least Concern (IUCN 3.1)

Scientific classification
- Kingdom: Animalia
- Phylum: Chordata
- Class: Reptilia
- Order: Squamata
- Suborder: Serpentes
- Family: Colubridae
- Genus: Lampropeltis
- Species: L. polyzona

Binomial name
- Lampropeltis polyzona Cope, 1860

= Lampropeltis polyzona =

Species of snake

Lampropeltis polyzona, commonly known as the Atlantic Central American milksnake, is a species of nonvenomous snake in the family Colubridae. It is found in Mexico.
