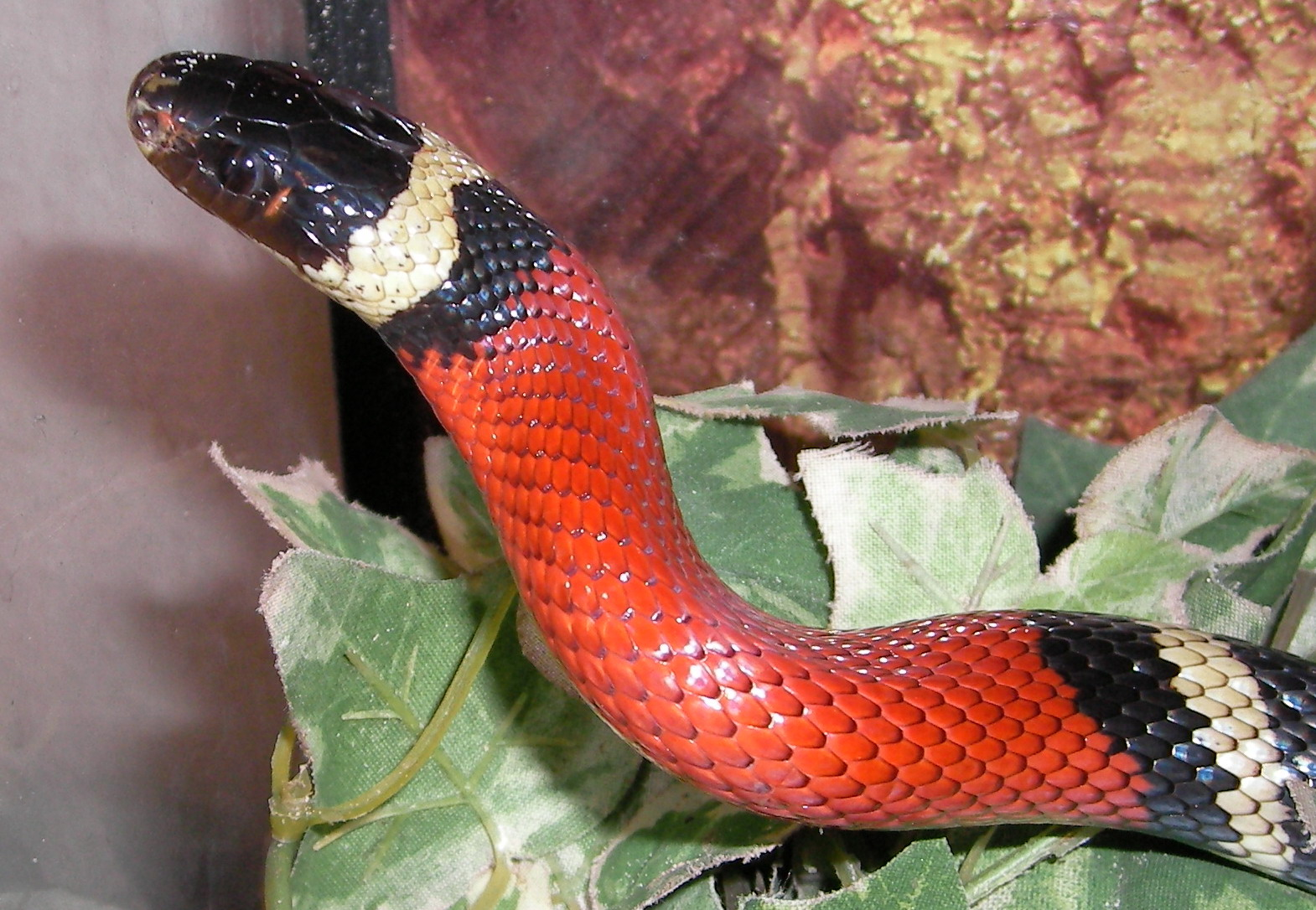
- Sinaloan milk snake

Scientific classification
- Kingdom: Animalia
- Phylum: Chordata
- Class: Reptilia
- Order: Squamata
- Suborder: Serpentes
- Family: Colubridae
- Genus: Lampropeltis
- Species: L. triangulum
- Subspecies: L. t. sinaloae

Trinomial name
- Lampropeltis triangulum sinaloae (K.L. Williams, 1978)

= Sinaloan milk snake =

Subspecies of snake

Lampropeltis triangulum sinaloae, commonly known as the Sinaloan milk snake, is an egg-laying subspecies of nonvenomous colubrid snake. It is one of the most commonly bred milk snakes in captivity. It is a fairly docile subspecies and will rarely bite. However, if handled, it may discharge a pungent smelling exudate from the cloaca as a warning. The Sinaloan milk snake inhabits the rocky and semi-arid drylands of southwestern Sonora, Sinaloa, and southwestern Chihuahua (Mexico).

== Description ==
The Sinaloan milk snake is predominantly blood red with distinct rings or bands of black which have thinner cream-colored, whitish, or (rarely) light cream-yellow bands within the black bands. The red rings are bordered near the edge of the ventrals by black pigment, leaving the center of the triad (on the ventral side) with a creamy white. The Sinaloan milk snake is easily distinguished from other subspecies because of the very broad bands of red which are much more prominent than in most other subspecies (far wider than the black bands). The head is black with a cream-colored band just behind the eyes across the top of the head. The belly is creamy-white. Fully grown adults can reach a length of approx. 120 cm. or more in some cases. Like other milk snakes, the Sinaloan milk snake is very agile.

== Habitat ==
The Sinaloan milk snake inhabits the dry, arid and rocky semi-desert regions in southwestern Sonora, Sinaloa and southwestern Chihuahua, Mexico. They are often found during the day resting beneath loose rocks, in rock crevices or beneath cactus plants. In areas close to urbanization, they are also found in barns and under piles of wood. Like other milk snakes, the Sinaloan milk snake is nocturnal and feeds after dark and at night. Milk snakes are much more opportunistic eaters than fox snakes or corn snakes. They have been known to consume a variety of animals including rodents, eggs, birds, reptiles, amphibians and invertebrates. Nevertheless, the diet of an adult milk snake still primarily consists of rodents.

== Reproduction ==
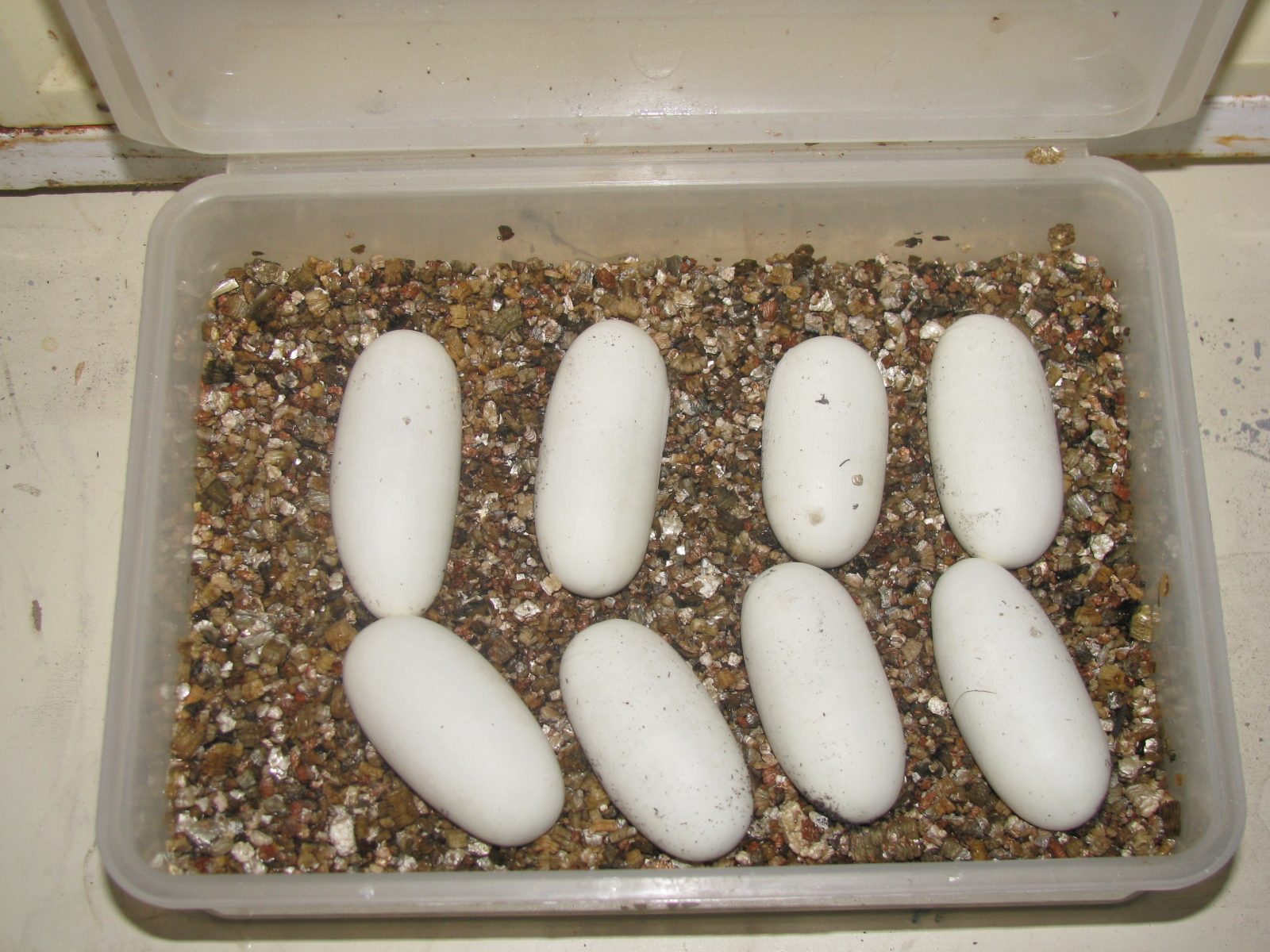
Sinaloan milk snake eggs

The Sinaloan milk snake mates from early May to late June, sometimes twice a year. The brumation period is between November and February. The female lays an average of 5–15 elongated eggs beneath rotting wood, boards, rocks and rotting vegetation. The eggs hatch after about 60 days. Like other members of the king snake family, the Sinaloan milk snake sometimes eats other snakes and does have at least some immunity to their venom.

== In captivity ==
Sinaloan milk snakes adapt well in captivity if kept between 80 and 85 degrees Fahrenheit, with a nighttime temperature drop of 5 to 10 degrees. Temperature control is important, as it maintains the animal's feeding response and digestion. Cages should be escape-proof and fresh water provided at all times. King snakes and milk snakes must be housed separately (except during the breeding season) because they are cannibalistic.

They can be flighty and will typically defecate when initially handled, though they will rarely bite. They become more docile with regular handling.
