= Kenneth L. Williams =

American zoologist (1934–2017)

- Born: Kenneth Lee Williams; September 4, 1934; Saybrook, Illinois
- Died: November 1, 2017 (aged 83); Natchitoches, Louisiana
- Education: Louisiana State University
- Known for: Expert on milk snakes
- Scientific career
- Fields: Herpetology
- Workplaces: Tulane University; Millikin University; Northwestern State University

Kenneth Lee Williams (September 4, 1934 – November 1, 2017) was an American herpetologist and author of books on the subject of snake biology and classification. Williams retired from teaching in Northwestern State University's biology department and received emeritus status in 2001. Williams is considered an authority on the milk snake and the herpetology of the Honduran Cloud Forest.

Williams was born in Saybrook, Illinois, and served one tour of duty with the U.S. Army after high school. He earned his bachelor's degree and master's from the University of Illinois, and his doctorate from Louisiana State University in 1970. After teaching at Tulane University in New Orleans and Millikin University in Decatur, Illinois, Williams came to Northwestern State University in 1966 as an assistant professor. He became a full professor there in 1976.

== Work ==
Over his 35 years at Northwestern State University Williams authored or co-authored 147 professional publications and received both NSU's Distinguished Faculty Award and their Alumni Association's Excellence in Teaching Award.

During his career, he specialized in studying the milk snake, Lampropeltis triangulum. In 1988, he published a book identifying 25 subspecies of milk snakes which is considered seminal and cited by most papers on milk snakes.

Together with Hobart Muir Smith, he discovered in Mexico a new snake species in the genus Geophis. They also identified the southeastern canyon lizard subspecies of the canyon lizard in 1960. In 1966 he co-discovered the Texas scarlet snake. In 1968 he identified Aspidoscelis inornatus paululus, a subspecies of the little striped whiptail. He is also credited with the identification of the following milk snake subspecies in 1978: Andean Milksnake, Conant's milk snake, Honduran milk snake, Sinaloan milk snake, Smith's milk snake, and Stuart's milk snake.

Williams concluded from his research that Lampropeltis triangulum temporalis is intermediate between the scarlet kingsnake and the eastern milk snake, and therefore that these so-called Coastal Plains phase milk snakes are intergrades and thus not a proper scientific designation.

In 2000, the subspecies Sceloporus merriami williamsi, a taxonomic patronym, was named to honor Kenneth L. Williams for being a specialist in snake classification and the herpetology of Honduras and Mexico.

== Selected bibliography ==
- Williams, Kenneth L. (1985), "Cemophora, C. coccinea ", Catalogue of American Amphibians and Reptiles, 374: 1–4
- Williams, Kenneth L. (1988), Systematics and natural history of the American milk snake, Lampropeltis triangulum, Milwaukee, WI (USA): Milwaukee Public Museum
- Williams, Kenneth L. (December 1994), Snakes of the World, Krieger Publishing Company, ISBN 0-89464-302-9
- Williams, Kenneth L. (1994), "Lampropeltis triangulum ", Catalogue of American Amphibians and Reptiles, 594: 1–10
- Wilson, Larry David [in French]; Williams, Kenneth L. (2002), "Scolecophis, Scolecophis atrocinctus ", Catalogue of American Amphibians and Reptiles, 758: 1–3
