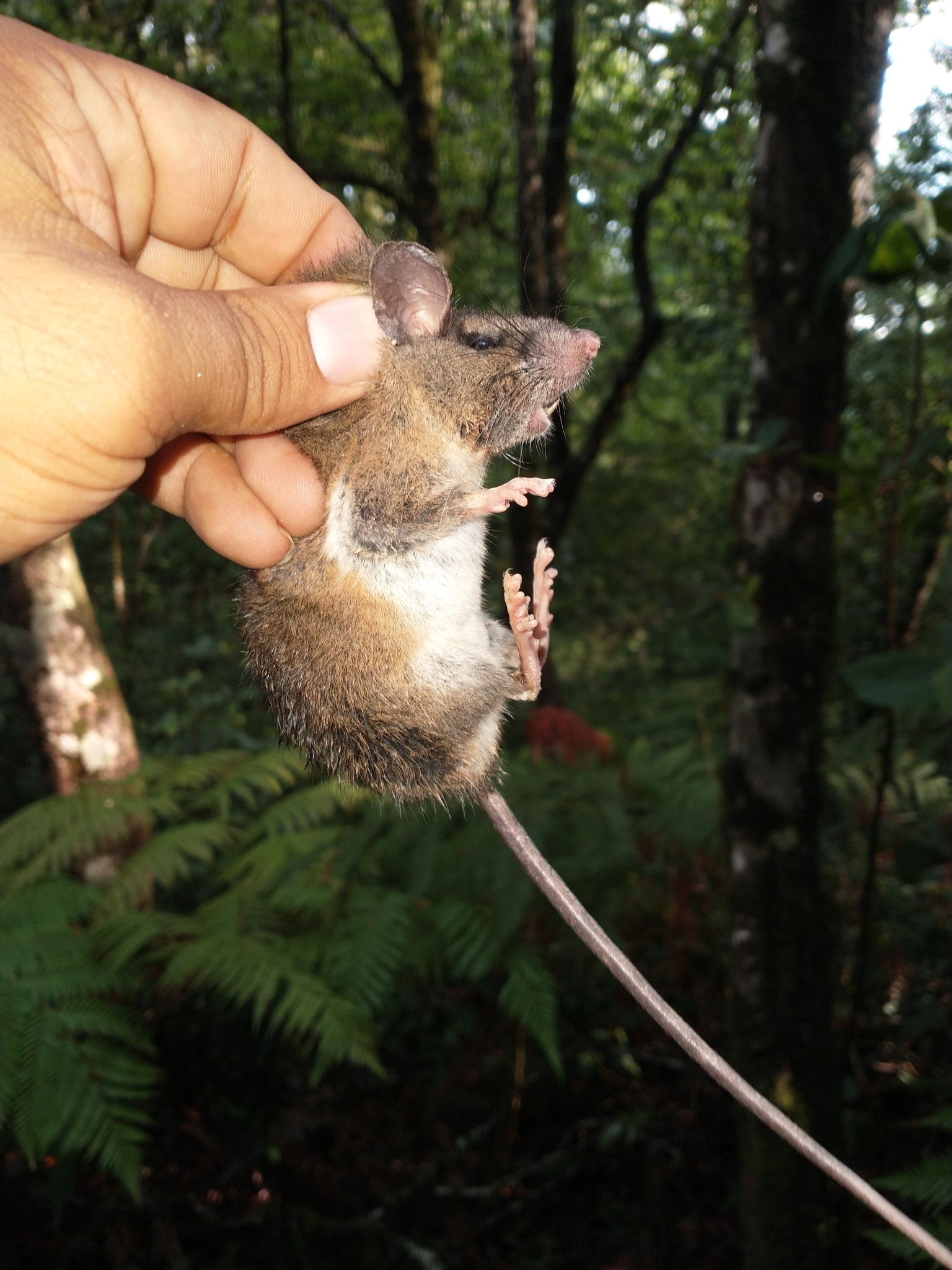

Conservation status
- Endangered (IUCN 3.1)

Scientific classification
- Kingdom: Animalia
- Phylum: Chordata
- Class: Mammalia
- Order: Rodentia
- Family: Cricetidae
- Subfamily: Neotominae
- Genus: Megadontomys
- Species: M. nelsoni

Binomial name
- Megadontomys nelsoni (Merriam, 1898)

= Nelson's giant deer mouse =

Species of rodent

Nelson's giant deer mouse (Megadontomys nelsoni) is a species of rodent in the family Cricetidae. It is found only in Mexico.
