= Green snake =

Green snake or Greensnake or Green Snake may refer to:

== Snakes ==
- Opheodrys, a genus of colubrid snakes from North America
  - Smooth green snake (Opheodrys vernali)
  - Rough green snake (Opheodrys aestivus)
- Ptyas, a genus of colubrid snakes from Asia
  - Greater green snake (Ptyas major)
  - Sakashima green snake (Ptyas herminae)
  - Doria's green snake (Ptyas doriae)
  - Ptyas nigromarginata or green rat snake
- Gonyosoma, a genus of colubrid snakes from Asia
  - Green trinket snake (Gonyosoma prasinum)
- Ahaetulla, a genus of colubrid snakes from Asia
  - Malayan green whipsnake (Ahaetulla mycterizans)
  - Sri Lankan green vine snake (Ahaetulla nasuta)
- Green whip snake (Hierophis viridiflavus), a species of colubrid snakes from Europe
- Oxybelis fulgidus or green vine snake, a species of colubrid snakes from Central and South America

== Other uses ==
- Xiaoqing (character), a fictional snake from the Chinese legend Madam White Snake
- Green Snake (1993 film), a Hong Kong film starring Maggie Cheung as Xiaoqing
- Green Snake (2021 film), a Chinese computer animation fantasy film
- The Green Snake and the Beautiful Lily, a German fairy tale by Johann Wolfgang von Goethe
- Chorokbaem Media ("Green Snake Media"), a Korean drama and animation company
