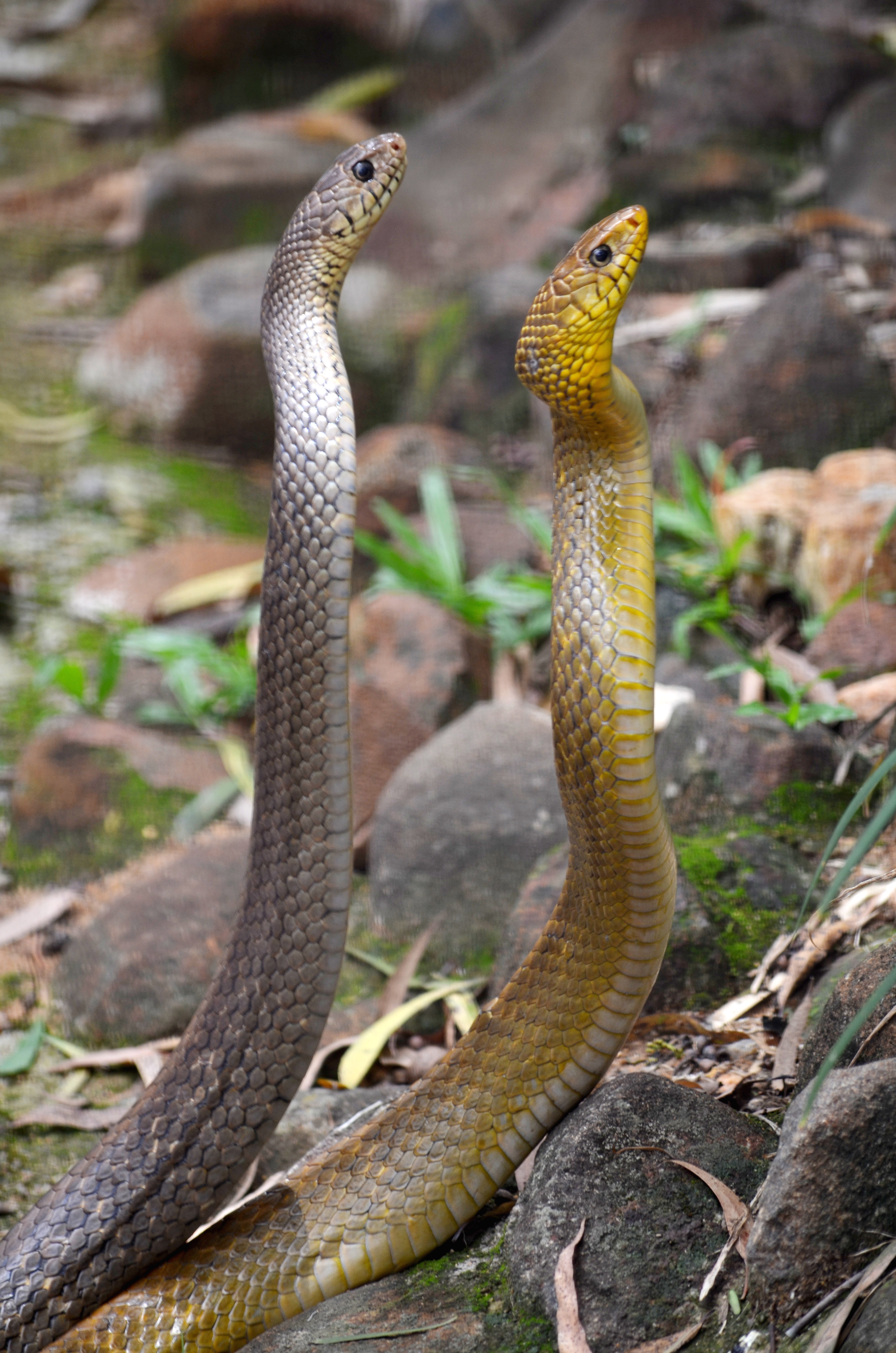
- Indian rat snakes (grey and yellow)

Conservation status
- Least Concern (IUCN 3.1)

Scientific classification
- Kingdom: Animalia
- Phylum: Chordata
- Class: Reptilia
- Order: Squamata
- Suborder: Serpentes
- Family: Colubridae
- Genus: Ptyas
- Species: P. mucosa

Binomial name
- Ptyas mucosa (Linnaeus, 1758)

Synonyms
- Coluber mucosus Linnaeus, 1758; Natrix mucosa Laurenti, 1768; Coluber blumenbachii Merrem, 1820; Coluber dhumna Cantor, 1839; Ptyas blumenbachii Fitzinger, 1843; Coryphodon blumenbachii A.M.C. Duméril and Bibron, 1854; Leptophis trifrenatus Hallowell, 1861; Ptyas mucosus Cope, 1861; Zamenis mucosus Boulenger, 1890; Zaocys mucosus Wall, 1921; Ptyas mucosa David and Das, 2004

= Oriental rat snake =

Species of snake

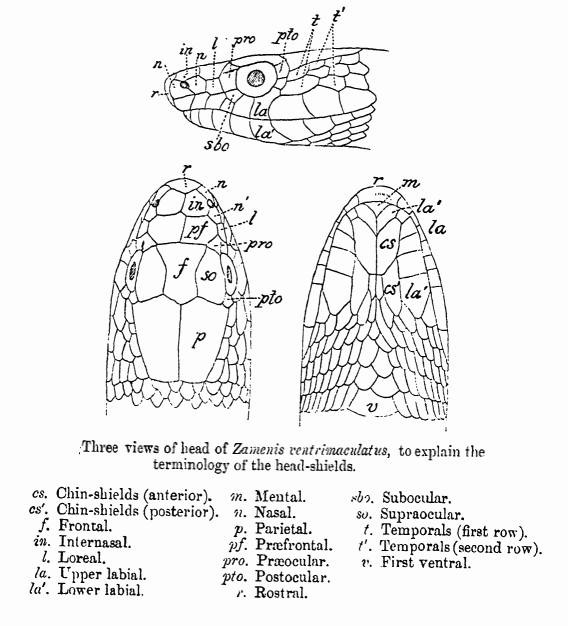
Scale pattern

Ptyas mucosa, commonly known as the Oriental rat snake, or Indian rat snake, is a common non-venomous species of colubrid snake found in parts of South and Southeast Asia. These are large snakes. Typical mature total length is around 1.5 to 1.95 m (4 ft 11 in to 6 ft 5 in) though some exceed 2 m (6 ft 7 in). The record length for this species was 3.7 m (12 ft 2 in), second only to their cousin Ptyas carinata among living colubrid snakes. Despite their large size, oriental ratsnakes are usually quite slender with even a specimen of 2 m (6 ft 7 in) commonly measuring 4 to 6 cm (1.6 to 2.4 in) only around in diameter. Furthermore, the average weight of ratsnakes caught in Java was around 877 to 940 g (1.933 to 2.072 lb), though larger males of over 2.3 m (7 ft 7 in) (which average mildly larger of the two sexes in the species) may easily weigh over 2.5 kg (5.5 lb). Their color varies from pale browns in dry regions to nearly black in moist forest areas. Rat snakes are diurnal, semi-arboreal, non-venomous, and fast-moving. Rat snakes eat a variety of prey and are frequently found in urban areas where rodents thrive.

== Etymology ==
The International Code for Zoological Nomenclature (ICZN) directs that the grammatical gender of any given species name should follow logically from the gender of its associated genus name. As Ptyas is a feminine word form (from πτυάς, a Greek word for a venom-spitting snake), the proper form of the species name is mucosa (a Late Latin word meaning "slimy"). Reference materials older than 2004 often show the masculine form, mucosus, and the CITES list continues to list the species this way.

== Distribution ==
Found in Afghanistan, Bangladesh, Myanmar, Cambodia, China (Zhejiang, Hubei, Jiangxi, Fujian, Guangdong, Hainan, Guangxi, Yunnan, Tibet, Hong Kong), Taiwan, India (including Andaman and Nicobar Islands), Sri Lanka, Indonesia (Sumatra, Java, Bali), Iran, Laos, West Malaysia, Nepal, Myanmar, Pakistan (Sindh area), Thailand, Turkmenistan and Vietnam.

== Description ==
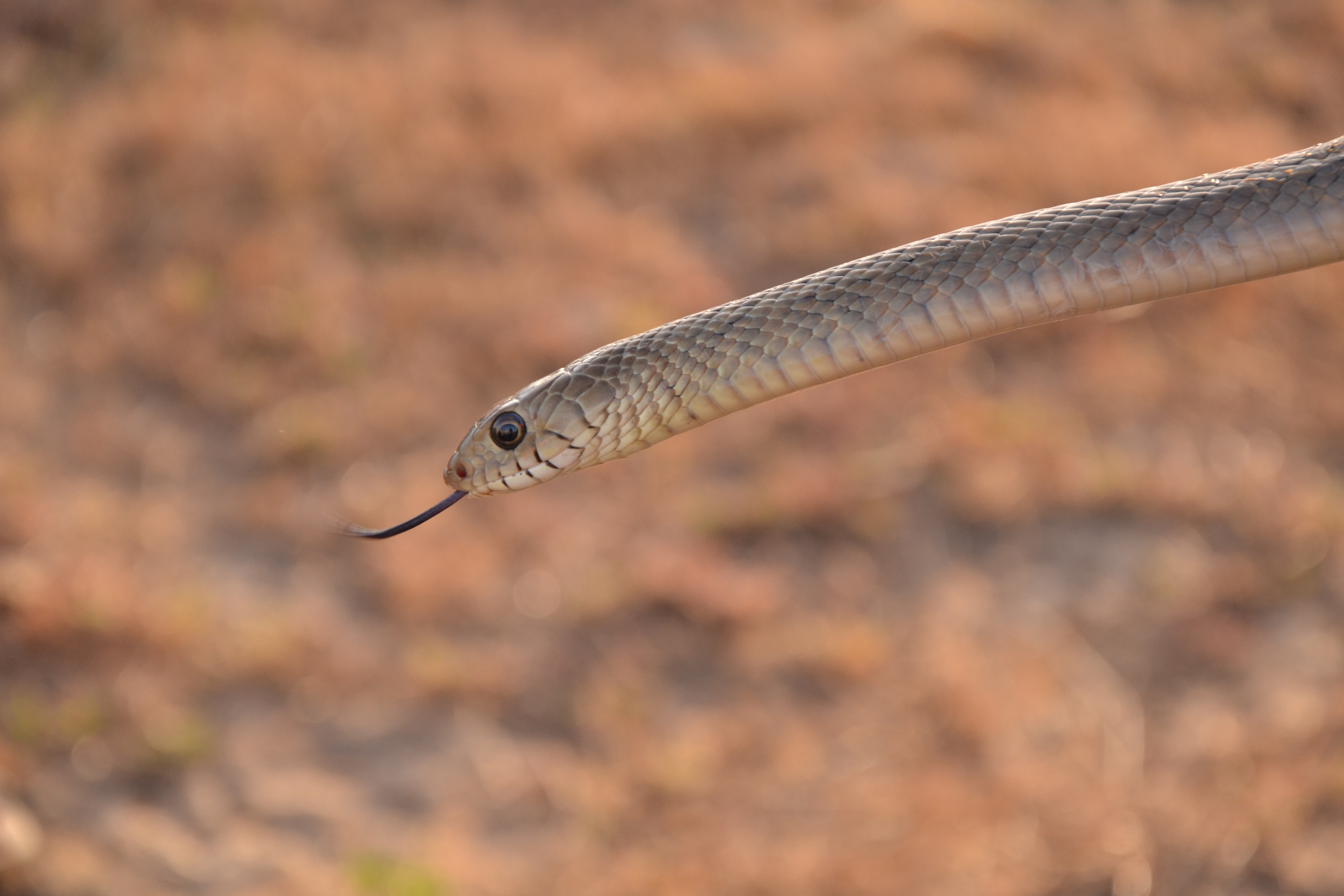
An oriental rat snake found in southern India.

Description from Boulenger's Fauna of British India: Reptilia and Batrachia volume of 1890:

Snout obtuse, slightly projecting; eye large; rostral a little broader than deep, visible from above; suture between the internasals shorter than that between the prefrontals; frontal as long as its distance from the end of the snout, as long as the parietals or slightly shorter; usually three loreals; one large preocular, with a small subocular below; two postoculars; temporals 2+2; 8 Upper labials, fourth and fifth entering the eye; 5 Lower labials in contact with the anterior chin shields, which are shorter than the posterior; the latter in contact anteriorly. Dorsal scales in 17 rows at midbody, more or less strongly keeled on the posterior part of the body. Ventrals 190–208; anal divided; subcaudals 95–135, divided. Brown above, frequently with more or less distinct black crossbands on the posterior part of the body and on the tail; young usually with light crossbands on the front half of the body. Lower surface yellowish; the posterior ventral and the caudal shields may be edged with black.

It is the second largest snake in Sri Lanka, after the Indian rock python.

== Ecology ==
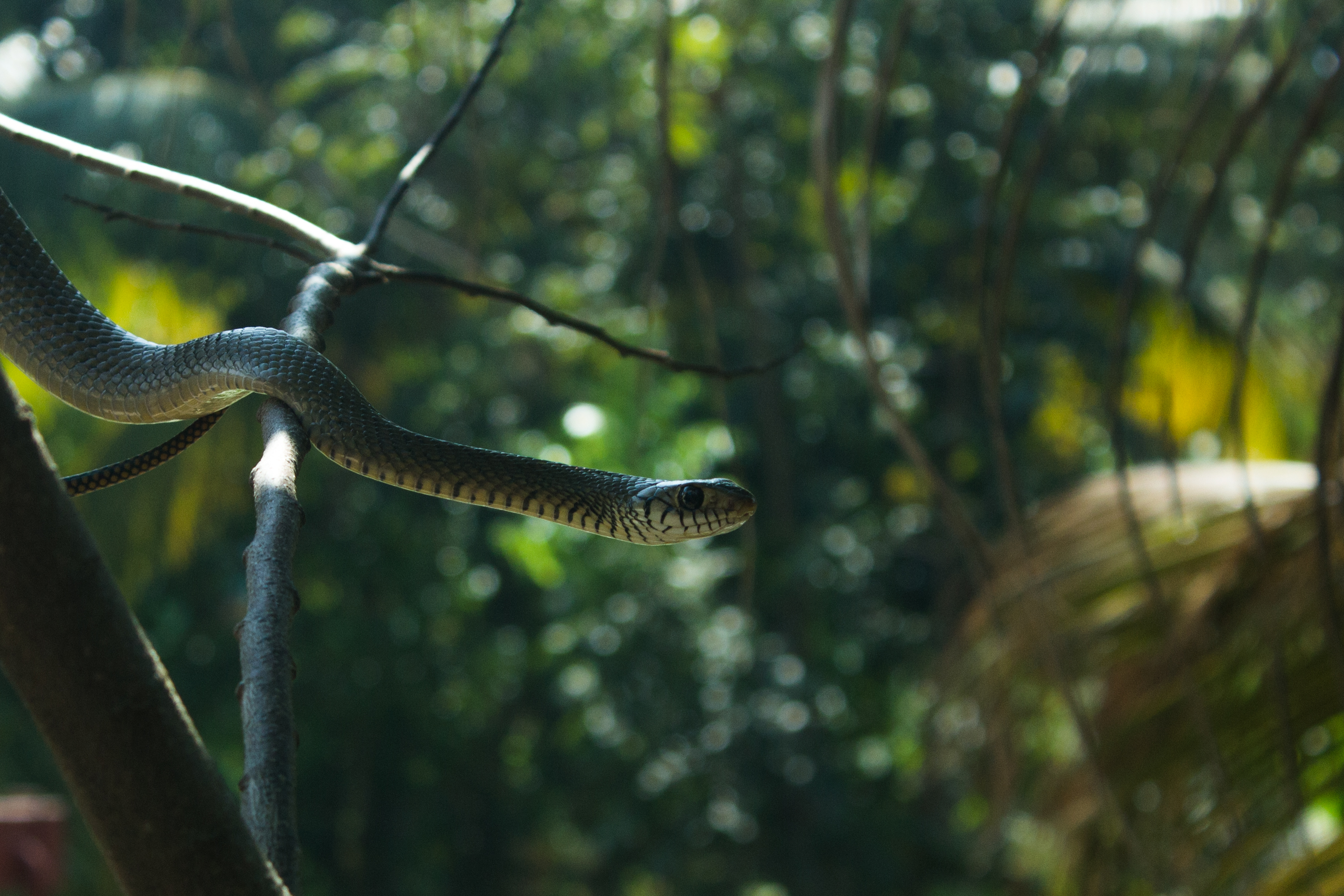
Ptyas mucosa

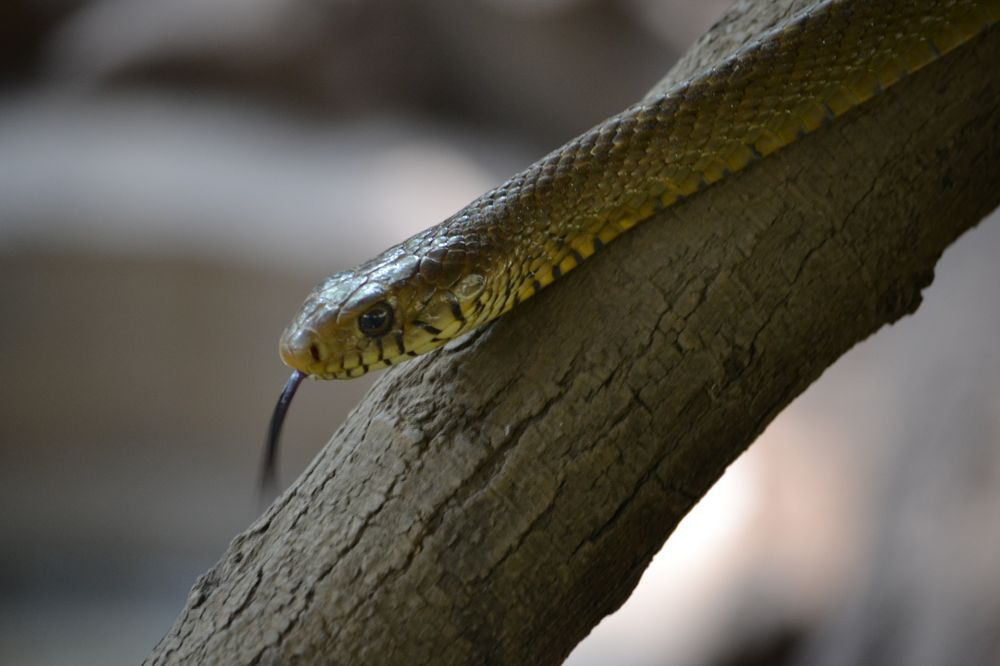
Indian rat snake on a branch

Rat snakes, though harmless to humans, are fast-moving, excitable snakes. Rat snakes are diurnal and semi-arboreal. They inhabit forest floors, wetlands, rice paddies, farmland, and suburban areas where they prey upon small reptiles, amphibians, birds, and mammals. Adults, unusually for a colubrid, prefer to subdue their prey by sitting on it rather than by constricting, using body weight to weaken prey. In captivity, they are territorial and may defend their turf aggressively, attempting to startle or strike at passing objects.

=== Reproduction ===
Rat snakes mate in late spring and early summer, though in tropical areas reproduction may take place year round. Males establish boundaries of territory using a ritualised test of strength in which they intertwine their bodies. The behaviour is sometime misread by observers as a "mating dance" between opposite-sex individuals. Females produce 6–15 eggs per clutch several weeks after mating.

=== Threat display ===
Adult members of this species emit a growling sound and inflate their necks when threatened. This adaptation may represent mimicry of the king cobra or Indian cobra which overlaps this species in range. The resemblance often backfires in human settlements, though, as the harmless animal may be mistaken for a venomous snake and killed.

=== Predators ===
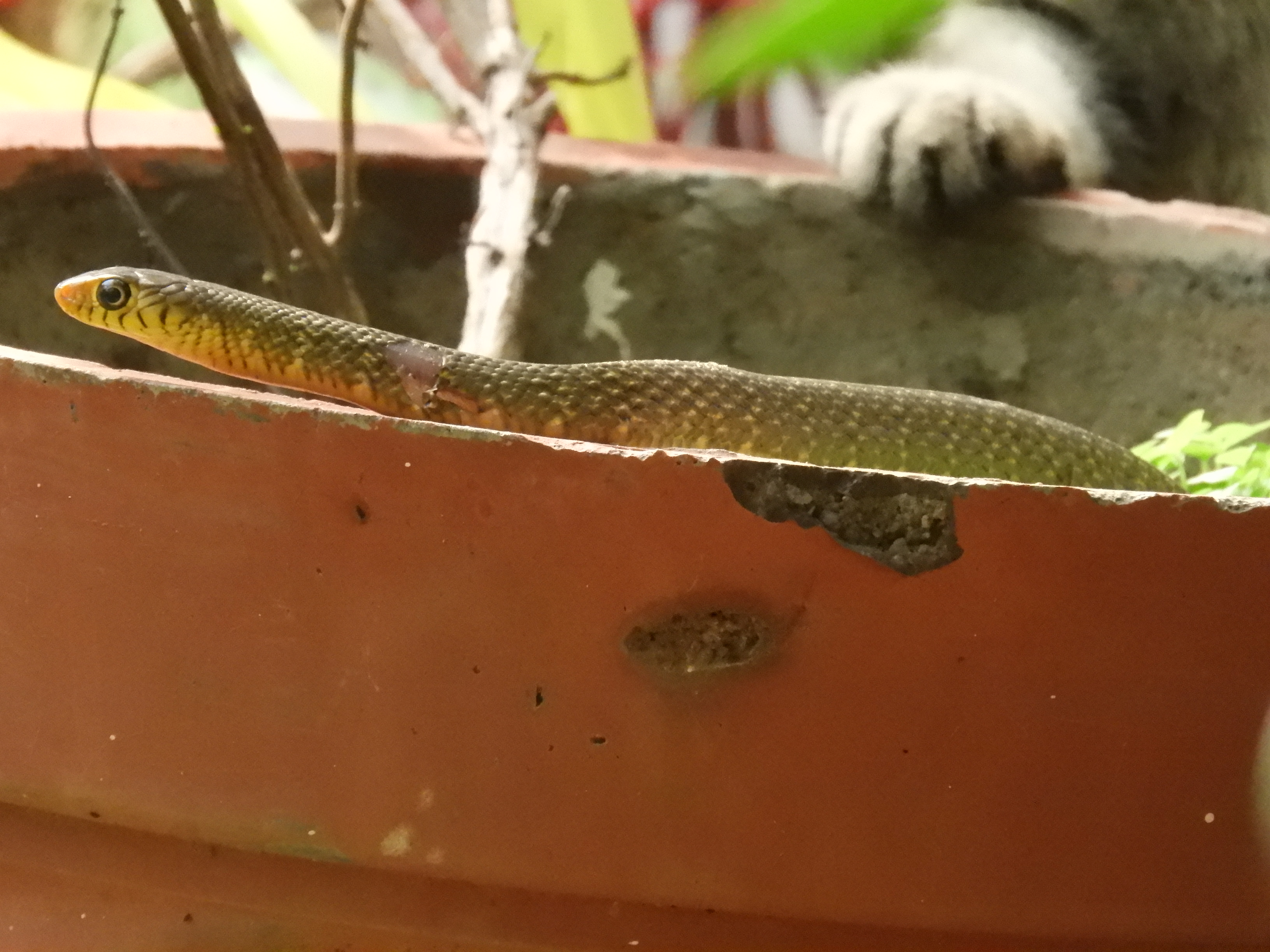
A juvenile with a scratch from a street cat

Adult rat snakes have no natural predators, although younger specimens are the natural prey of King cobras that overlap them in their range. Juveniles fear birds of prey, larger reptiles, and mid-sized mammals. They are wary, quick to react, and fast-moving.

Rat snakes and related colubrids are aggressively hunted by humans in some areas of their range for skins and meat. Harvesting and trade regulations exist in China and Indonesia, but these regulations are often ignored.

== Gallery ==
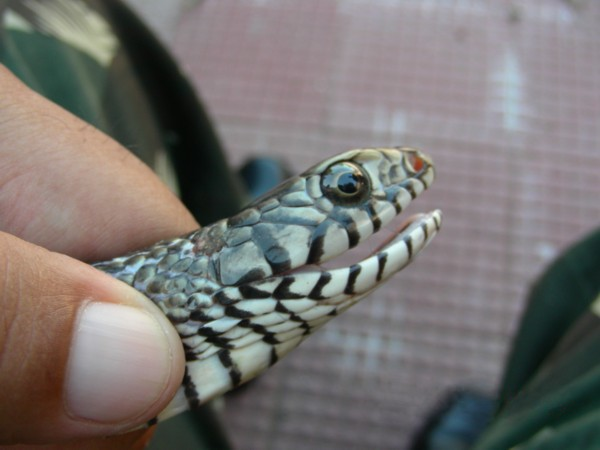
Head with open mouth

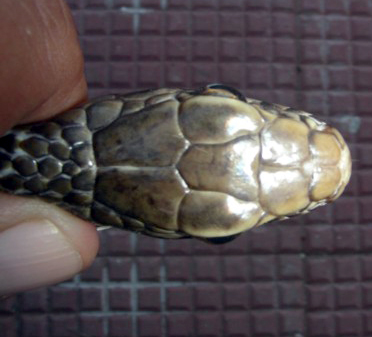
Top view of head

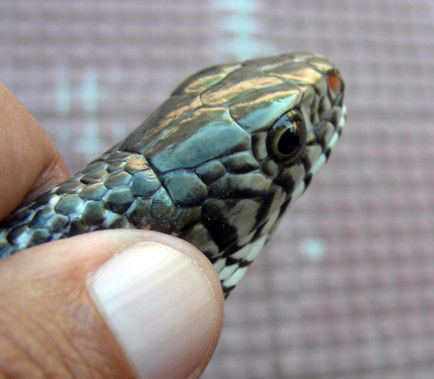
View of temporals

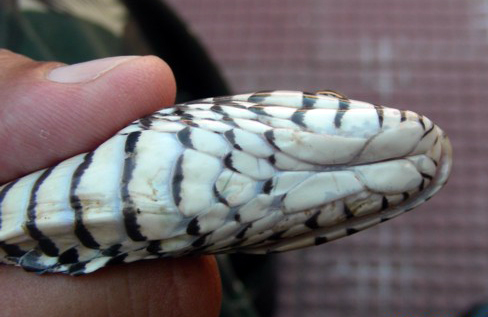
Underside of head

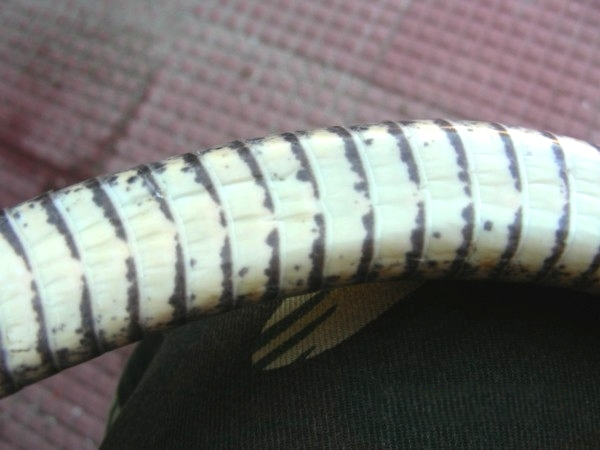
Belly of snake

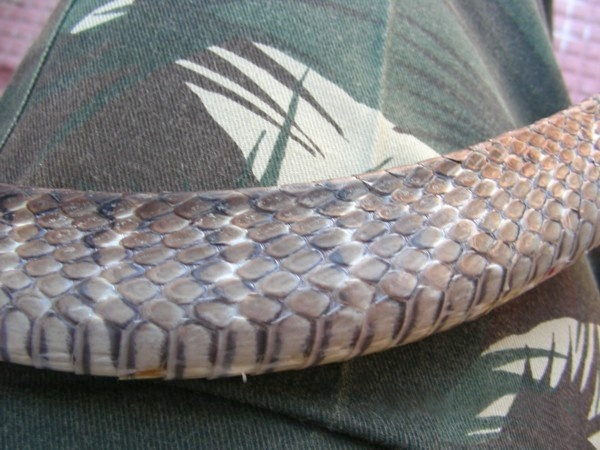
Body and scales

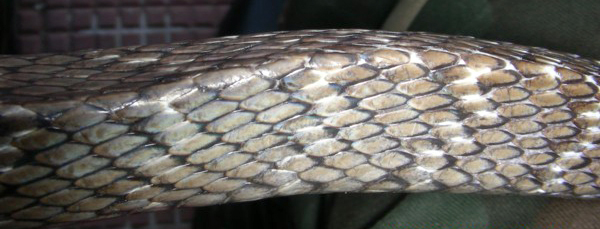
Body and scales

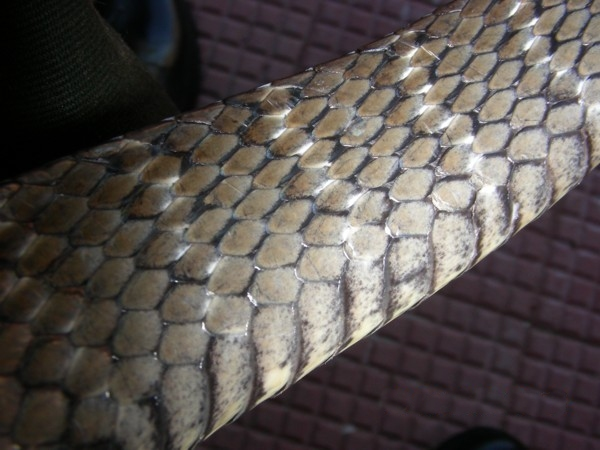
Body and scales

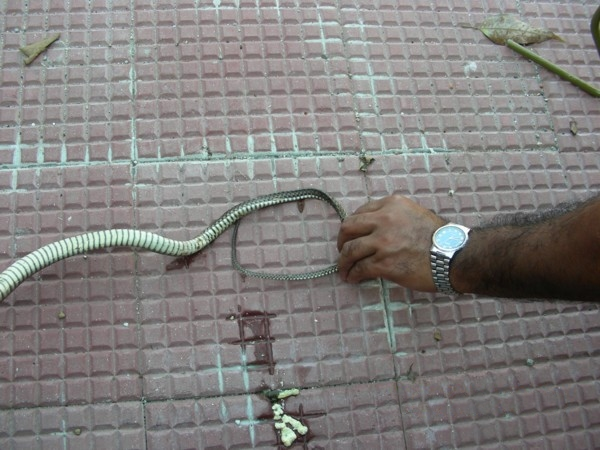
Long tail of oriental rat snake

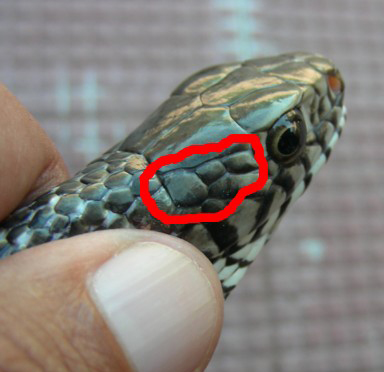
Temporals indicated
