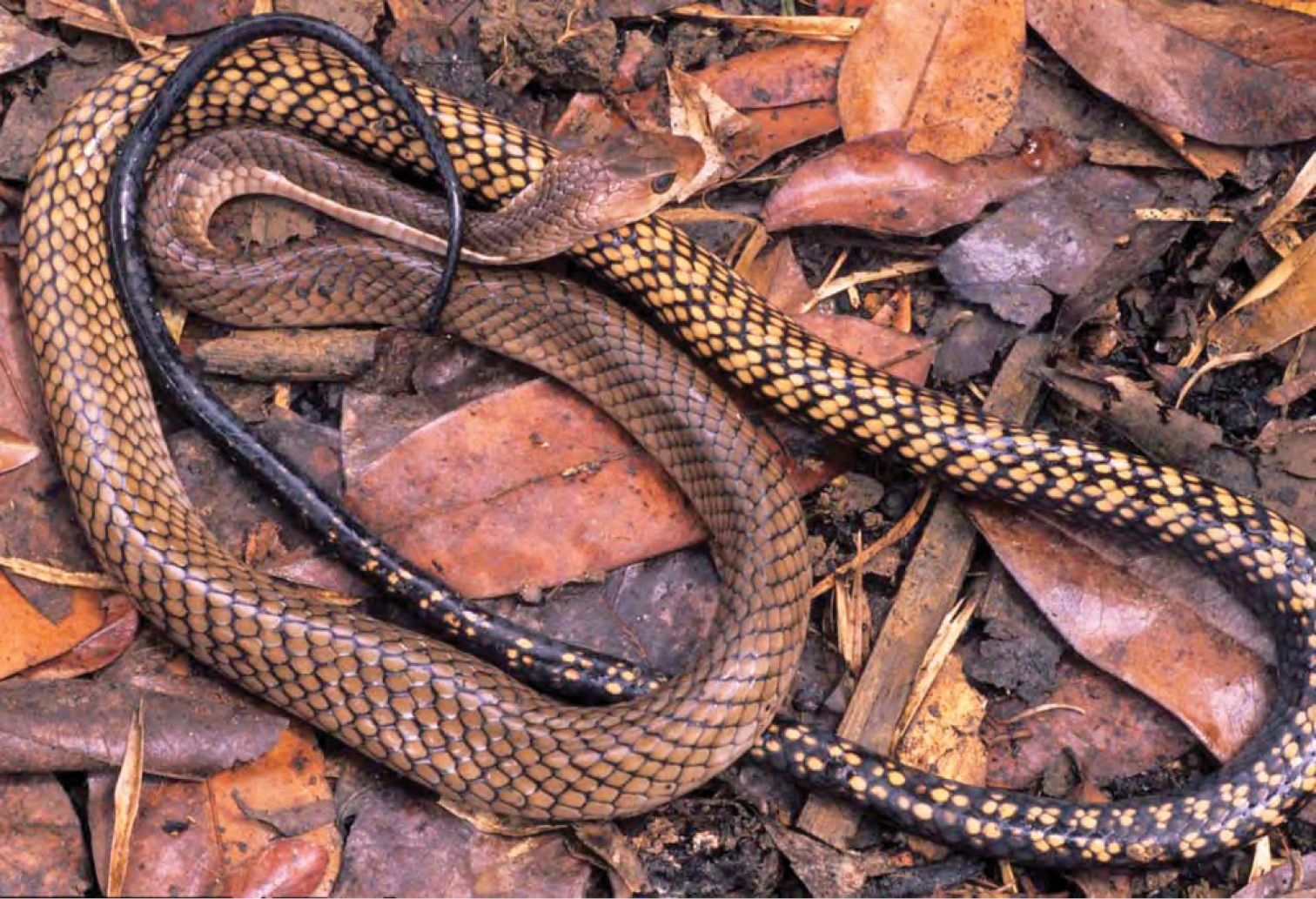
- Smooth-scaled mountain rat snake in Isabela, Philippines

Conservation status
- Least Concern (IUCN 3.1)

Scientific classification
- Kingdom: Animalia
- Phylum: Chordata
- Class: Reptilia
- Order: Squamata
- Suborder: Serpentes
- Family: Colubridae
- Genus: Ptyas
- Species: P. luzonensis

Binomial name
- Ptyas luzonensis (Günther, 1873)

Synonyms
- Zaocys luzonensis Günther, 1873

= Ptyas luzonensis =

Species of rat snake endemic to the Philippines

Ptyas luzonensis, commonly known as the smooth-scaled mountain rat snake, is a species of rat snake in the family Colubridae. It is endemic to the Philippines.

== Taxonomy ==
The specific name, luzonensis, refers to Luzon island in the Philippines, the type locality. Its other English common names are Philippine mountain rat snake, smooth-scaled rat snake, and Philippine rat snake.

== Description ==
Ptyas luzonensis closely resembles Ptyas carinata (keeled rat snake) but differ through the following characteristics:

- P. luzonensis has its dorsal body scales on the anterior third of its body arranged in 14 longitudinal rows, while P. carinata has 16 or 18 longitudinal rows.
- P. luzonensis has smooth mid-dorsal body scales while P. carinata has keeled mid-dorsal body scales.

P. luzonensis is diurnal.

== Distribution and habitat ==
Ptyas luzonensis is endemic to the Philippine islands of Luzon, Polillo, Catanduanes, Leyte, Panay, and Negros. It inhabits lowland tropical forests but can also tolerate a wide variety of habitats. It frequents the forest floor during daytime and prefers vegetation and plant branches near bodies of water at night.

== Ecology ==
P. luzonensis is a prey of the Philippine eagle population in the Cordillera Central. It is also a host of the East Indies reptile tick (Amblyomma helvolum).

IUCN red list version 3.1 in 2022 categorized P. luzonensis as a least-concern species. Meanwhile, in the Philippine Red List threat category of 2020, it is listed among the Other Threatened Species (OTS). It is threatened by deforestation and being killed by humans who mistake it for a cobra.
