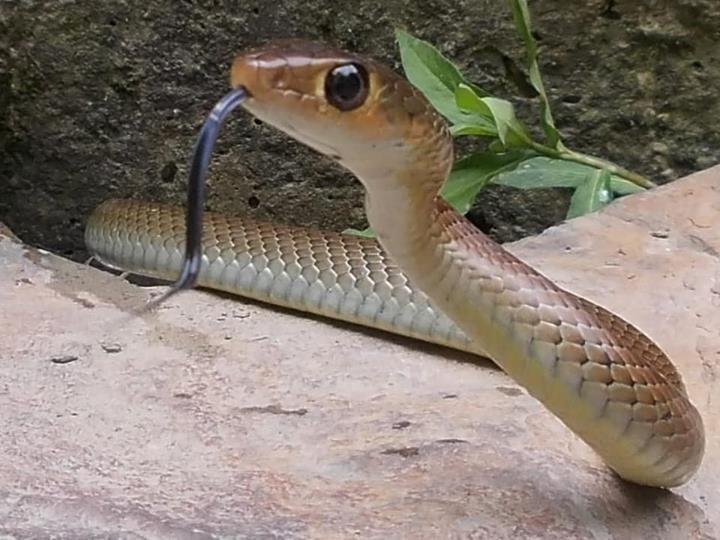

Conservation status
- Near Threatened (IUCN 3.1)

Scientific classification
- Kingdom: Animalia
- Phylum: Chordata
- Class: Reptilia
- Order: Squamata
- Suborder: Serpentes
- Family: Colubridae
- Genus: Ptyas
- Species: P. korros

Binomial name
- Ptyas korros (Schlegel, 1837)

Synonyms
- Coluber korros Schlegel, 1837; Coryphodon korros — A.M.C. Duméril & Bibron, 1854; Ptyas korros — Cope, 1860; Zamenis korros — Boulenger, 1890; Ptyas korros — Stejneger, 1907; Zamenis korros — Wall, 1908; Liopeltis libertatis Barbour, 1910; Ptyas korros — M.A. Smith, 1943

= Ptyas korros =

Species of reptile

Ptyas korros, commonly known as the Chinese rat snake or Indo-Chinese rat snake, is a species of colubrid snake endemic to Southeast Asia.

== Description ==
Snout obtuse, projecting; eye very large. Head broader than neck. Rostral visible from above; internasals shorter than the prefrontals; frontal as long as its distance from the tip of the snout or a little longer, as long as the parietals; two or three loreals; a large preocular, sometimes touching the frontal; a small subocular below; two postoculars; temporals 2 + 2; eight upper labials, fourth and fifth entering the eye; five lower labials in contact with the anterior chin-shields, which are shorter than the posterior.

Dorsal scales smooth or feebly keeled on the posterior part of the body, in 15 rows at midbody; ventrals 160–177; anal divided; sub-caudals 122–145.

Brown or olive above; the scales on the posterior part of the body and on the tail often yellow and edged with black. Lower surface yellow. Young specimens with transverse series of round whitish spots or with narrow yellow transverse bars.

Length of head and body 1,080 mm (43 in); tail 700 mm (28 in).

== Distribution ==
Nepal, Myanmar; Cambodia, China (Zhejiang, Jiangxi, Fujian, Guangdong, Hainan, Guangxi, Hunan, Yunnan, Hong Kong), Taiwan, India (Assam; Manipur; Arunachal Pradesh (Namdapha - Changlang district, Chessa, Chimpu, Itanagar - Papum Pare district), Tripura, Bangladesh, Indonesia (Sumatra, Borneo, Java, Bali), Laos, Thailand, Vietnam, West Malaysia and Singapore Island. Found up to 3000 m above sea level.

== Behavior and diet ==
It is a diurnal species. Both arboreal and terrestrial. Found in forests as well near human habitation. Sleeps on bushes and trees. The diet includes rodents, birds, lizards and frogs. Females lay 4-12 eggs in June-July.
