= Ptyas multicincta =

Conservation status
- Least Concern (IUCN 3.1)

Scientific classification
- Kingdom: Animalia
- Phylum: Chordata
- Class: Reptilia
- Order: Squamata
- Suborder: Serpentes
- Family: Colubridae
- Genus: Ptyas
- Species: P. multicincta

Binomial name
- Ptyas multicincta (Roux, 1907)

Species of snake

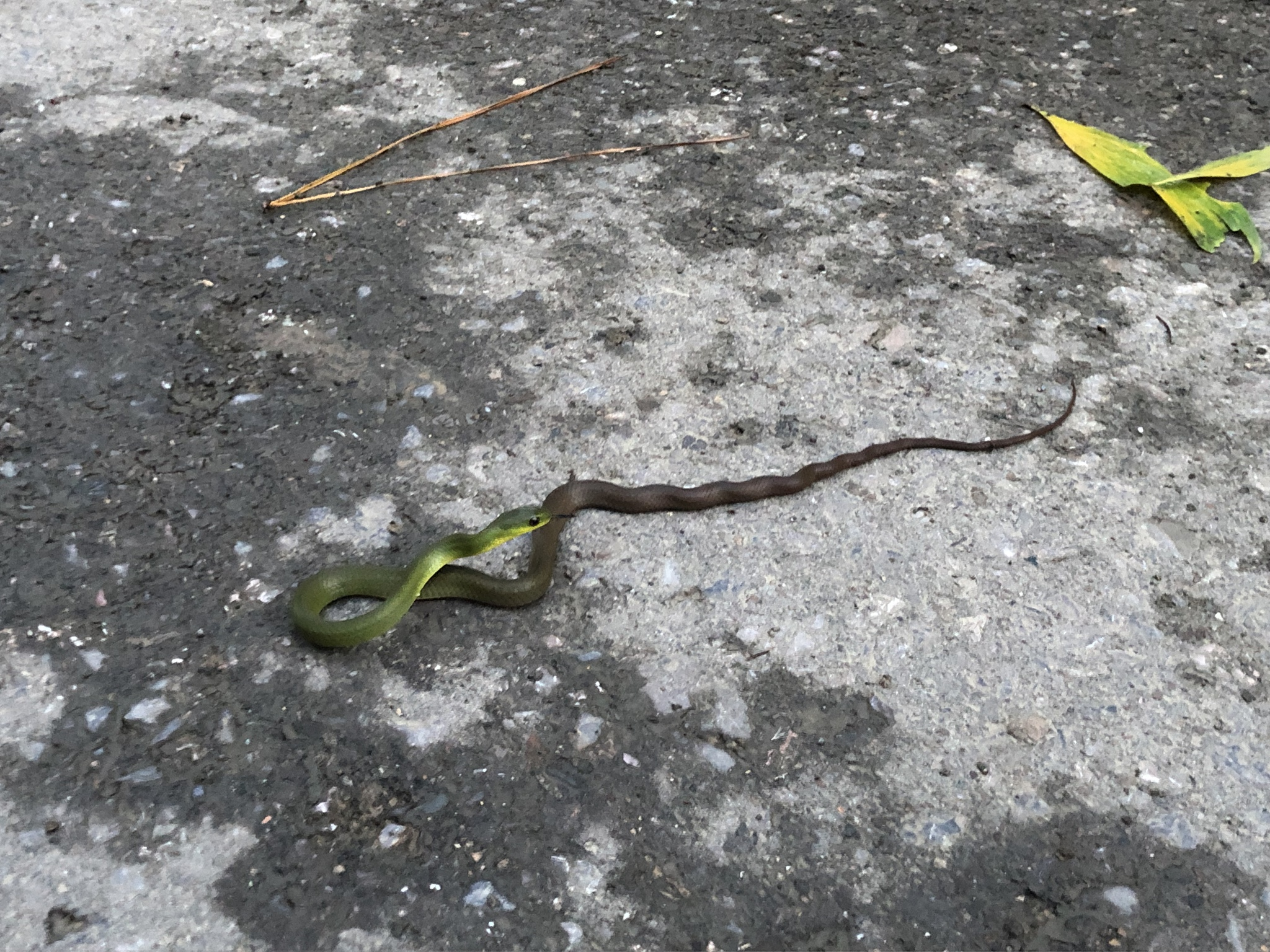

Ptyas multicincta, the many-banded green snake or north China green snake, is a species of snake of the family Colubridae.

The snake is found in China, Laos, Vietnam, and Thailand.
