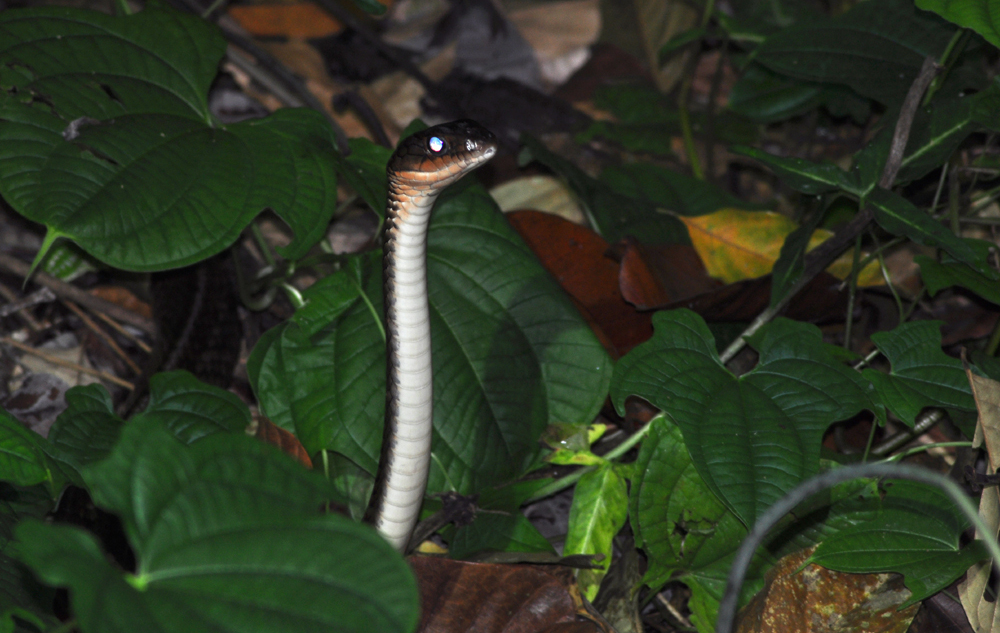
- Adult snake in threat display in Venus Drive, Singapore.

Conservation status
- Least Concern (IUCN 3.1)

Scientific classification
- Kingdom: Animalia
- Phylum: Chordata
- Class: Reptilia
- Order: Squamata
- Suborder: Serpentes
- Family: Colubridae
- Genus: Ptyas
- Species: P. fusca

Binomial name
- Ptyas fusca (Günther, 1858)

Synonyms
- Coryphodon fuscus Günther 1858; Zaocys fuscus Günther 1864; Zapyrus fuscus Boulenger 1885; Zaocys (Zapyrus) fuscus Boettger 1887; Zaocys fuscus Boulenger 1893; Ptyas fuscus Wall 1923; Zaocys fuscus Grandison 1978; Zaocys fuscusv Manthey 1983; Ptyas fuscus David & Vogel 1996; Ptyas fuscus Cox et al. 1998; Ptyas fuscus Malkmus et al. 2002; Ptyas fusca David & Das 2004

= Ptyas fusca =

Species of snake

Ptyas fusca, commonly known as the white-bellied rat snake or brown rat snake, is a species of colubrid snake. It is found in Indonesia, Brunei, Malaysia, Thailand and Singapore.

The white-bellied rat snake prefers forested habitats. They are known to prey on frogs and lizards and fish. It is known to remain still and hold neck erect when disturbed-a threatening posture.

The adults range from brown to brick-red colour on the upper surface. Ventral scales are white to pale yellowish in colour. Thick black stripes on either side of the posterior body and tail is a characteristic feature. Juveniles often greenish in coloration. The pupil is rounded and large.
