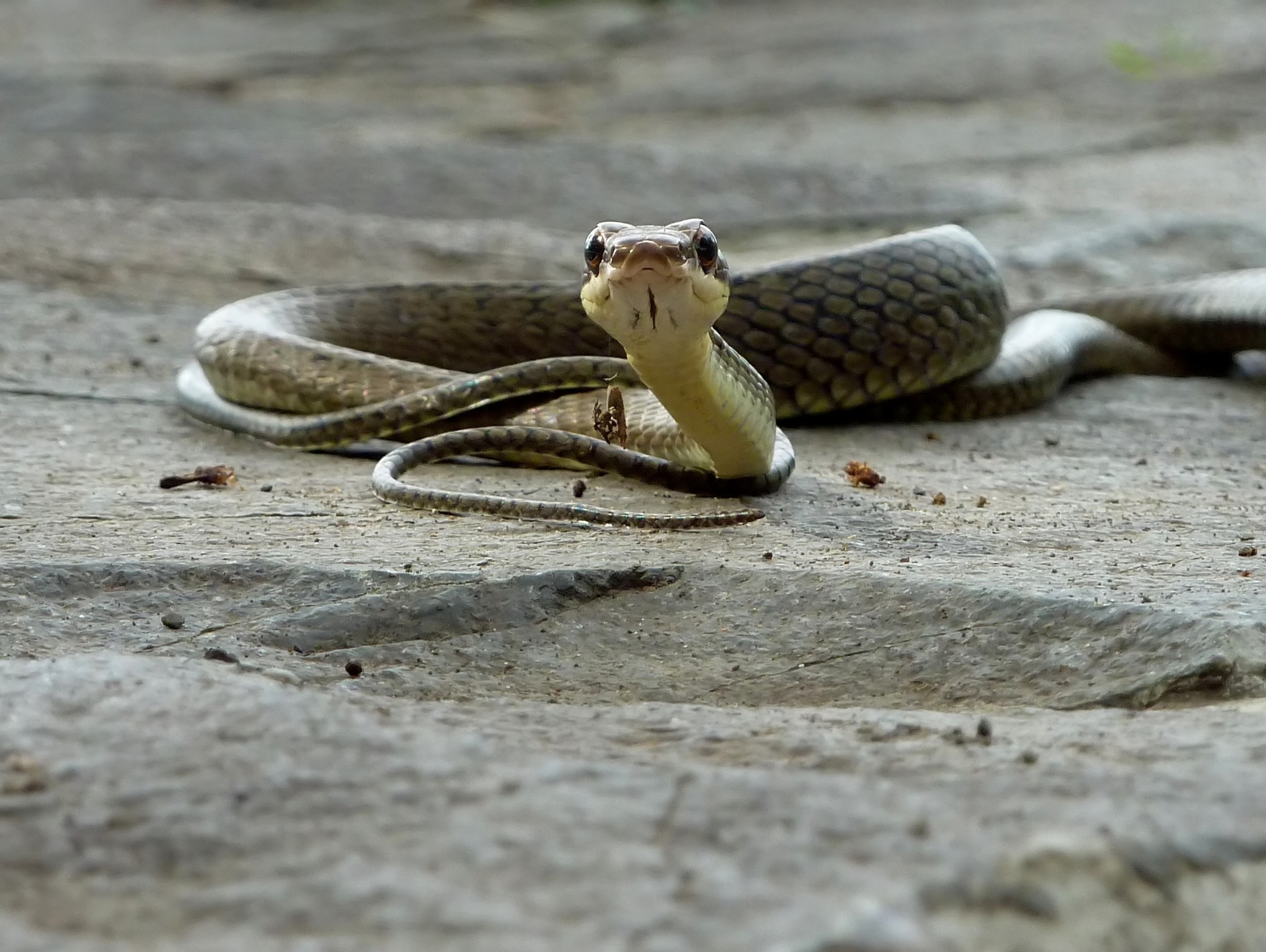

Conservation status
- Least Concern (IUCN 3.1)

Scientific classification
- Kingdom: Animalia
- Phylum: Chordata
- Class: Reptilia
- Order: Squamata
- Suborder: Serpentes
- Family: Colubridae
- Genus: Ptyas
- Species: P. dipsas

Binomial name
- Ptyas dipsas (Schlegel, 1837)

= Ptyas dipsas =

Species of snake

Ptyas dipsas, the Sulawesi black racer, is a species of snake of the family Colubridae.

The snake is found in Indonesia.
