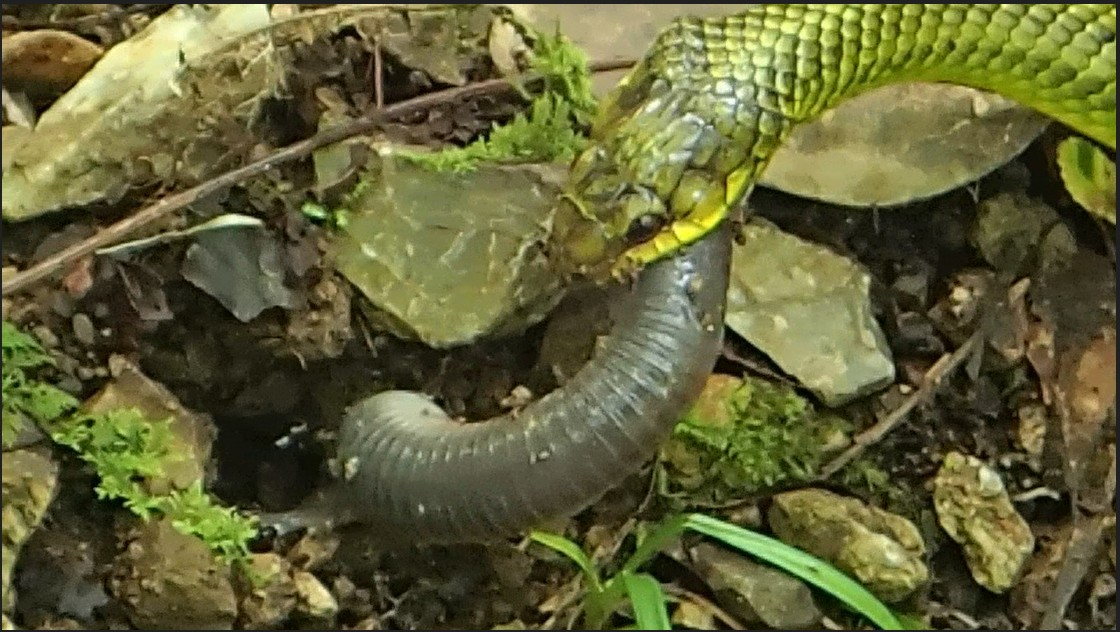

Conservation status
- Least Concern (IUCN 3.1)

Scientific classification
- Kingdom: Animalia
- Phylum: Chordata
- Class: Reptilia
- Order: Squamata
- Suborder: Serpentes
- Family: Colubridae
- Genus: Ptyas
- Species: P. semicarinata

Binomial name
- Ptyas semicarinata (Hallowell, 1861)

Synonyms
- Cyclophiops semicarinatus (Hallowell, 1861); Eurypholis semicarinatus Hallowell, 1861

= Ptyas semicarinata =

Species of snake

Ptyas semicarinata, the Ryukyu green snake, is a species of snake of the family Colubridae.

The snake is found in the Ryukyu Islands, Japan.
