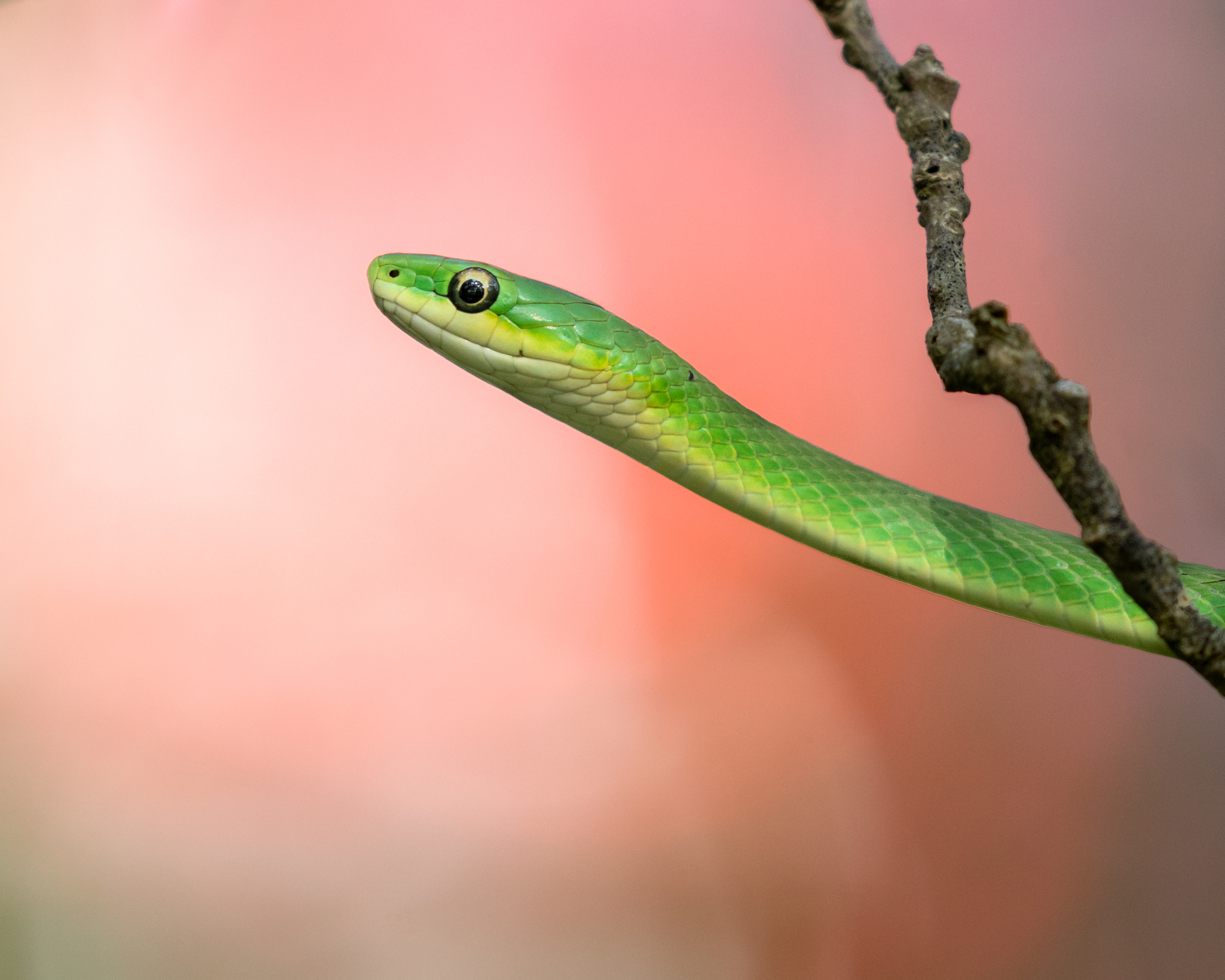
- Opheodrys aestivus
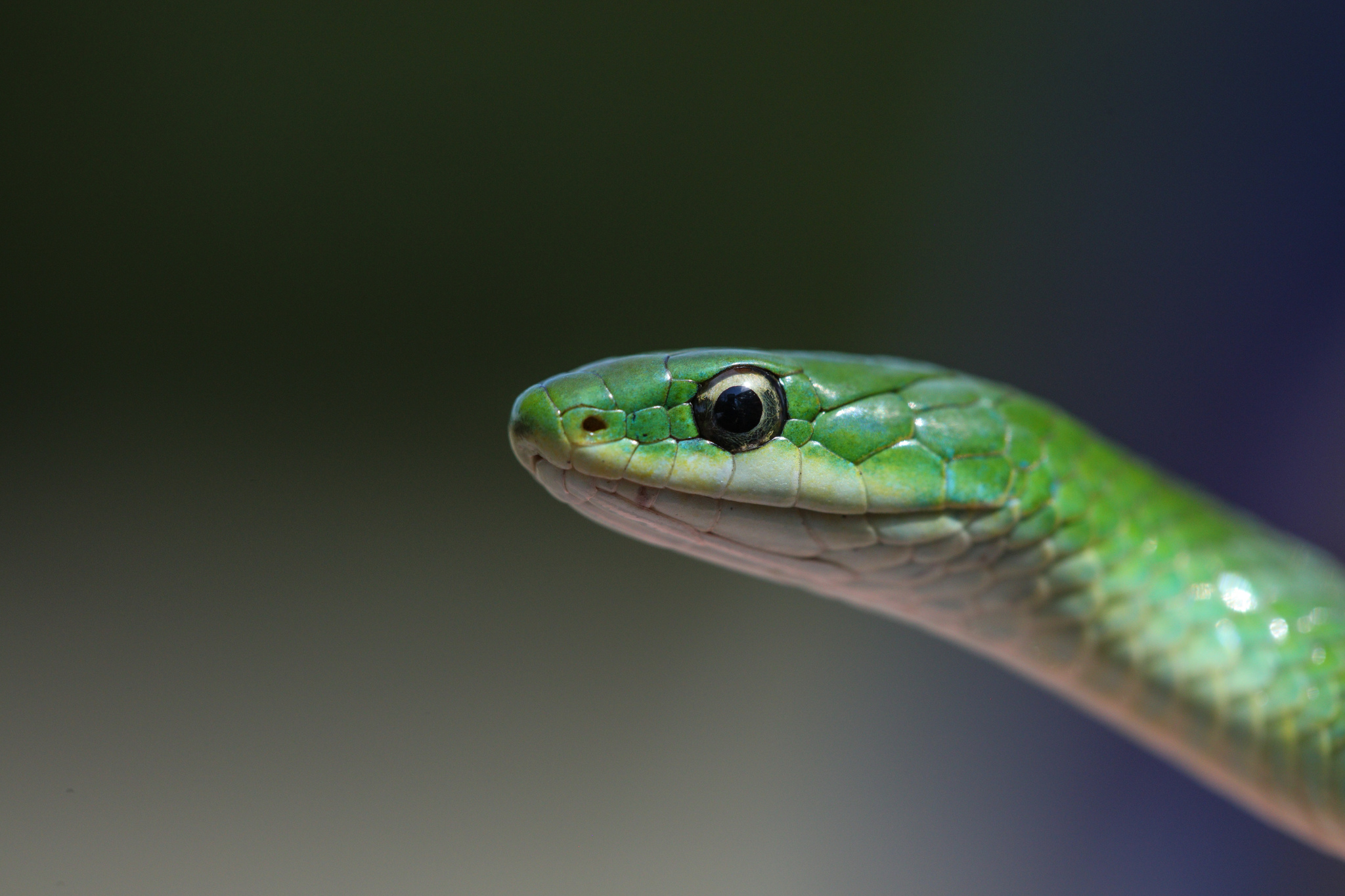
- Opheodrys vernalis

Scientific classification
- Kingdom: Animalia
- Phylum: Chordata
- Class: Reptilia
- Order: Squamata
- Suborder: Serpentes
- Family: Colubridae
- Subfamily: Colubrinae
- Genus: Opheodrys; Fitzinger, 1843

Synonyms
- Chlorosoma, Phyllophilophis, Liochlorophis

= Opheodrys =

Genus of snakes

Opheodrys is a genus of small to medium-sized nonvenomous colubrid snakes commonly referred to as green snakes. In North America the genus consists of two distinct species. As their common names imply, the rough green snake has keeled dorsal scales, whereas the smooth green snake has smooth dorsal scales.

== Taxonomy ==
The genus Opheodrys at one time included two Asian species: O. herminae, which is endemic to Japan, and O. major, which is endemic to Central/South China, Taiwan, N. Vietnam, and Laos. These were removed from the genus by Cundall in 1981

- Opheodrys herminae (Boettger, 1895) = Ptyas herminae (Boettger, 1895) – Sakashima green snake
- Opheodrys major (Günther, 1858) = Ptyas major (Günther, 1858) – greater green snake

=== Subspecies ===
The following subspecies of Opheodrys are no longer recognized by ITIS:

- Opheodrys aestivus aestivus (Linnaeus, 1766) – northern rough green snake
- Opheodrys aestivus carinatus Grobman, 1984 – Florida rough green snake
- Opheodrys vernalis blanchardi Grobman, 1941 – western smooth green snake
- Opheodrys vernalis borealis Grobman, 1992 – northern smooth green snake
- Opheodrys vernalis vernalis (Harlan, 1827) – eastern smooth green snake.

However, as of May 2023, The Reptile Database still recognizes the subspecies O. aestivus carinatus in addition to the nominotypical subspecies O. a. aestivus.

== Species ==
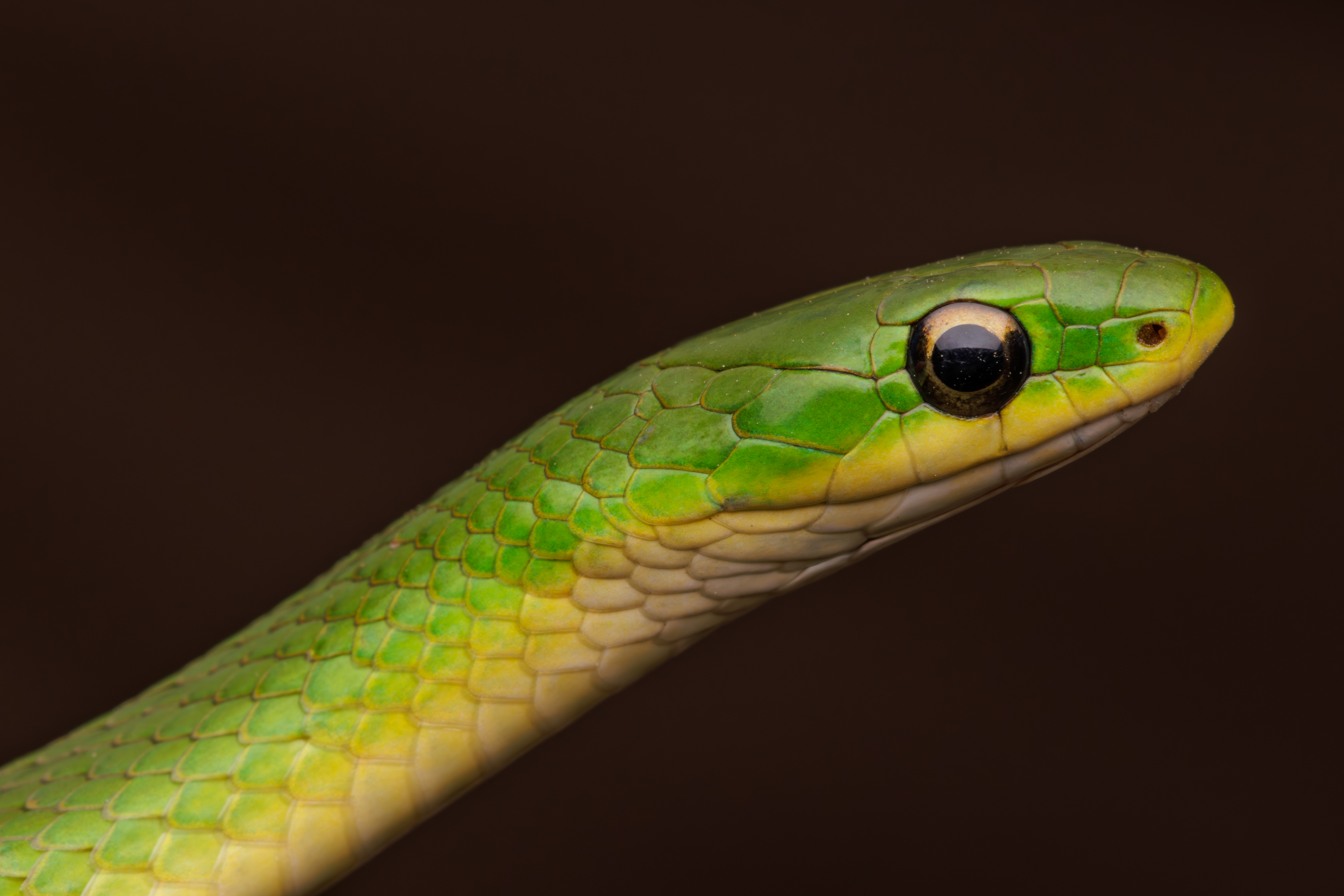
Smooth green snake (O. vernalis)

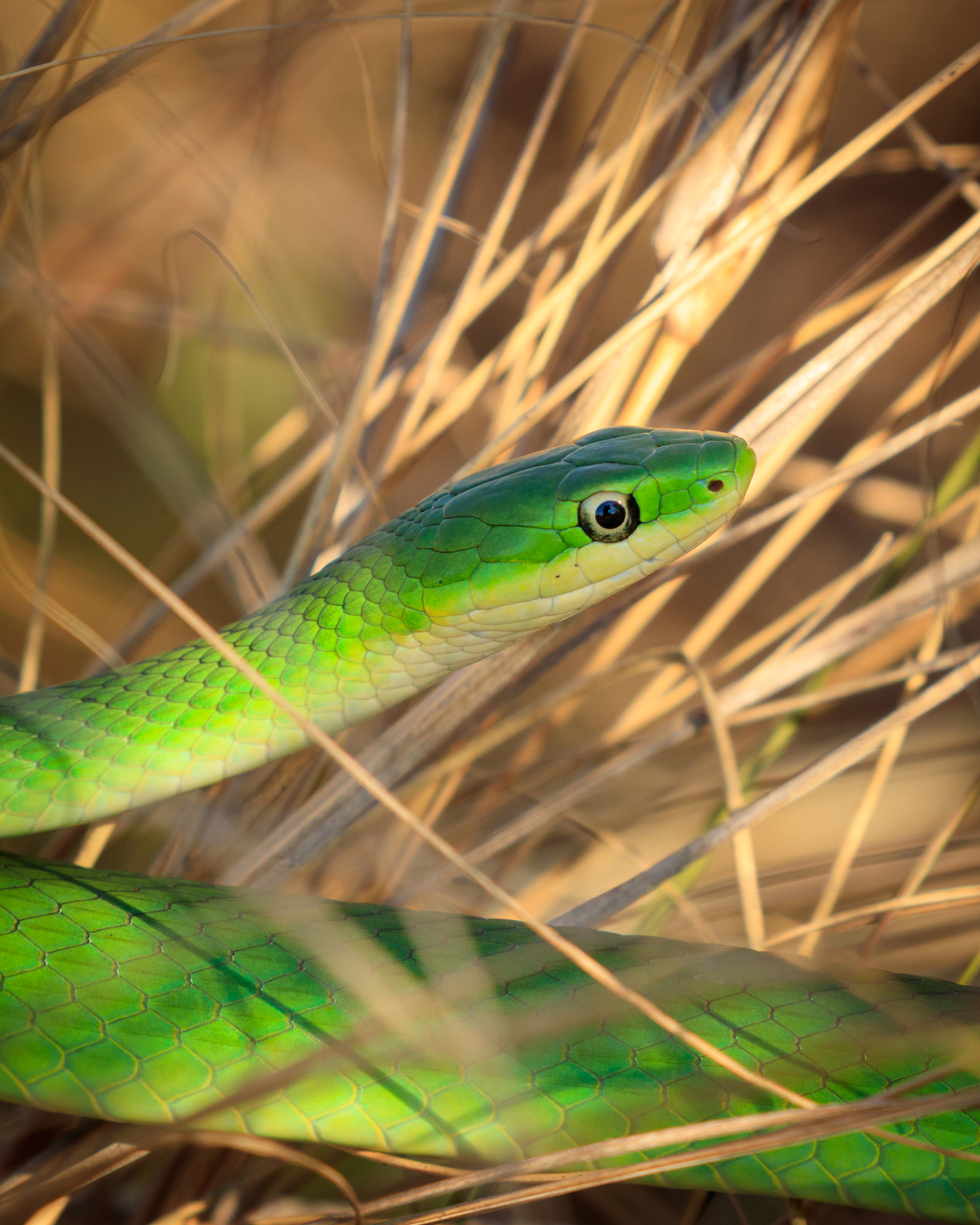
Rough green snake (O. aestivus)

The following two species are recognized as being valid.

| Image | Species | Common name |
|---|---|---|
| | Opheodrys aestivus (Linnaeus, 1766) | rough green snake |
| | Opheodrys vernalis (Harlan, 1827) | smooth green snake |

Nota bene: A binomial authority in parentheses indicates that the species was originally described in a genus other than Opheodrys.

== Geographic range ==
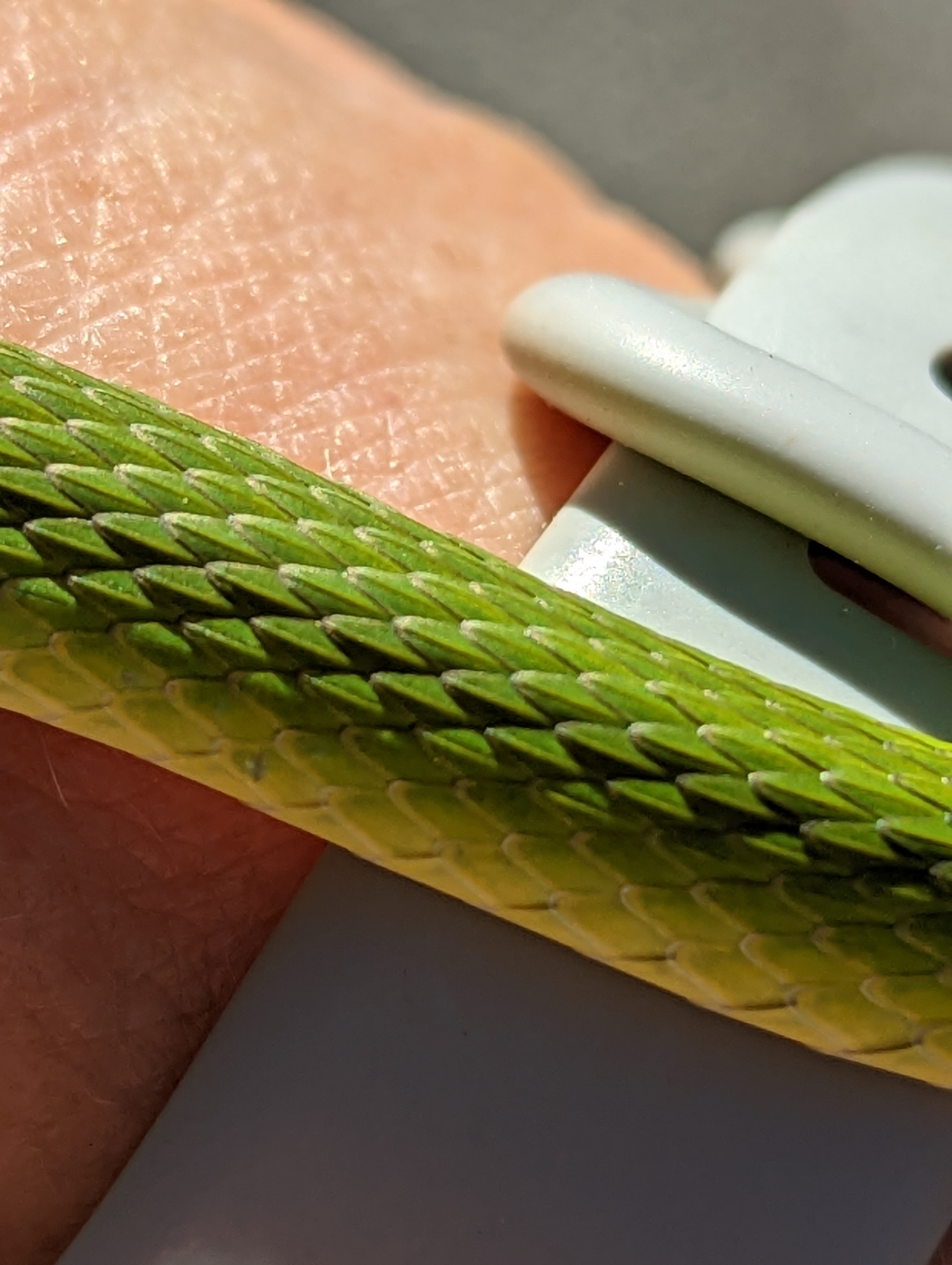
The keeled scalation of the rough green snake (O. aestivus) which distinguishes it from the smooth green snake (O. vernalis)

Green snakes of the genus Opheodrys are found in the United States, southern Canada, and northern Mexico.

== Description ==
Green snakes are so named because they are typically solid green in color dorsally, with a cream-colored or yellow underside. They are thin-bodied snakes that rarely exceed 90 cm (around 36 inches) in length. They have large eyes and blunt shaped heads.

== Habitat ==
Green snakes are often found in dense, low lying vegetation near a permanent water source.

== Behavior ==
Green snakes have been known to follow human activity. They rely on their color for camouflage and will usually attempt to escape if threatened.

== Diet ==
Their primary diet is soft-bodied arthropods, including crickets, spiders, moths, butterflies, and grasshoppers.

== Reproduction ==
Green snakes of the genus Opheodrys are oviparous.
