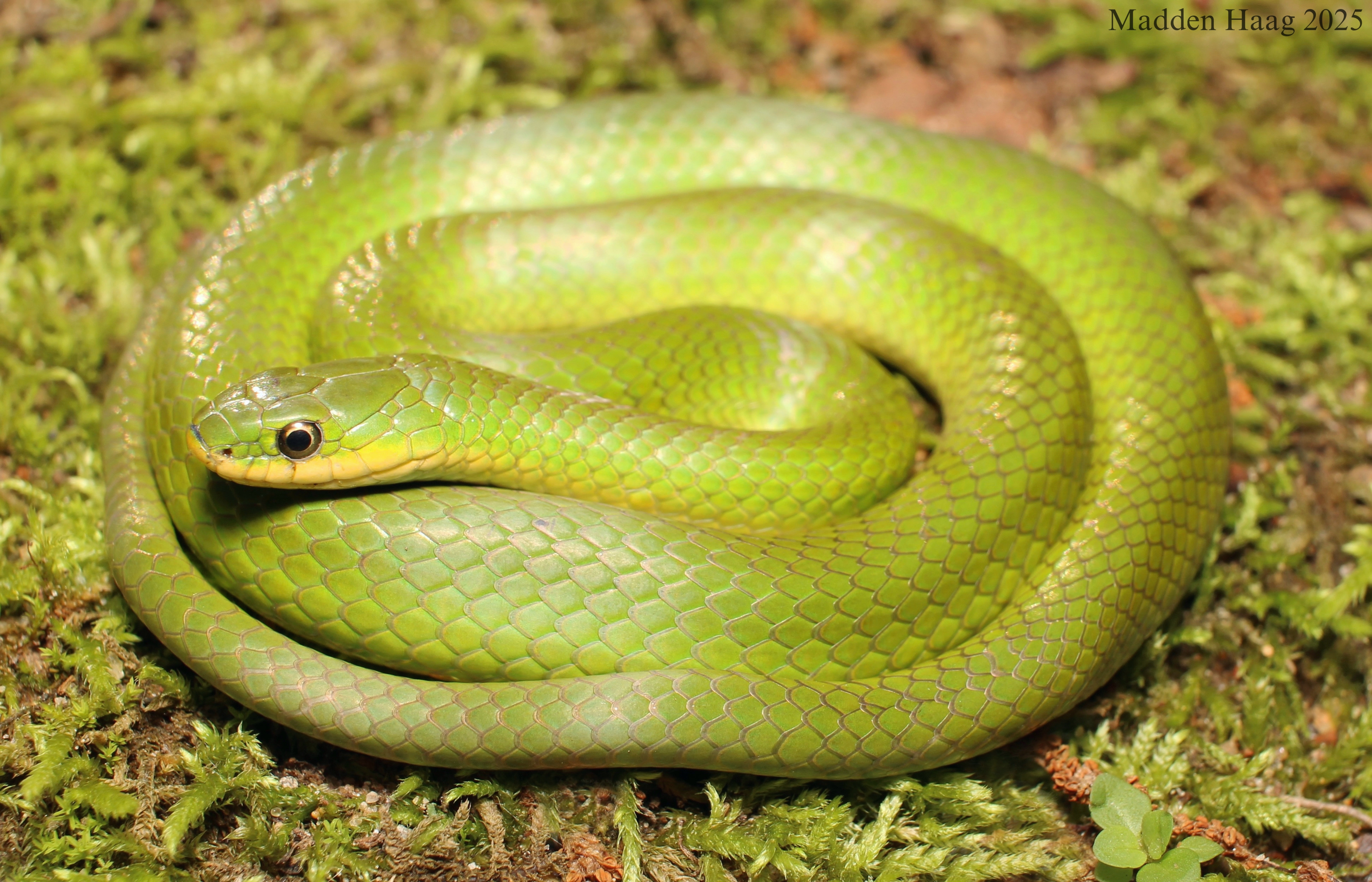
- Smooth green snake (Opheodrys vernalis)

Conservation status
- Least Concern (IUCN 3.1)

Scientific classification
- Kingdom: Animalia
- Phylum: Chordata
- Class: Reptilia
- Order: Squamata
- Suborder: Serpentes
- Family: Colubridae
- Genus: Opheodrys
- Species: O. vernalis

Binomial name
- Opheodrys vernalis (Harlan, 1827)

Synonyms
- List: Coluber vernalis Harlan, 1827; Chlorosoma vernalis — Baird & Girard, 1853; Herpetodryas vernalis — Hallowell, 1856; Cyclophis vernalis — Günther, 1858; Liopeltis vernalis — Cope, 1860; Contia vernalis — Boulenger, 1894; Eurypholis vernalis — Pope, 1935; Liochlorophis vernalis — Oldham & H.M. Smith, 1991; Opheodrys vernalis — Wallach et al., 2014

= Smooth green snake =

Species of snake

The smooth green snake (Opheodrys vernalis) is a species of North American nonvenomous snake in the family Colubridae. The species is also referred to as the grass snake. It is a slender, "small medium" snake that measures 36–51 cm (14–20 in) as an adult. It gets its common name from its smooth dorsal scales, as opposed to the rough green snake, which has keeled dorsal scales. The smooth green snake is found in marshes, meadows, open woods, and along stream edges, and is native to regions of Canada, the United States, and northern Mexico. A non-aggressive snake, it seldom bites and usually flees when threatened. It mates in late spring to summer, and females lay their eggs from June to September. The smooth green snake will often bob its head in order to mimic vegetation blowing in the wind.

== Description ==
The smooth green snake is slender. In size, it is classified as a "small medium" snake, reaching to 36–51 cm (14–20 in) in total length (including tail) as an adult. The longest smooth green snake was measured as being 66 cm (26 in) in total length. The tail makes up about 1/4 to 1/2 the total length of the snake; males have longer tails than females.

It is uniform light green on its back, with a yellow or white belly, and has smooth dorsal scales, unlike those of the rough green snake, which are keeled. Its smooth dorsal scales are arranged in 15 rows at midbody.

At birth, its dorsal coloration is different from that when it matures. At first, it can be olive green, blue-gray, or even brown, but after it sheds its skin for the first time, it becomes the characteristic bright green. The dorsal coloration can also vary depending on location: bluish in Kansas, olive-tinted light brown in southeastern Texas, and bronze in northern Wisconsin.

It uses its tongue, red with a black end, by flicking it in and out of its mouth to "smell" its surroundings.

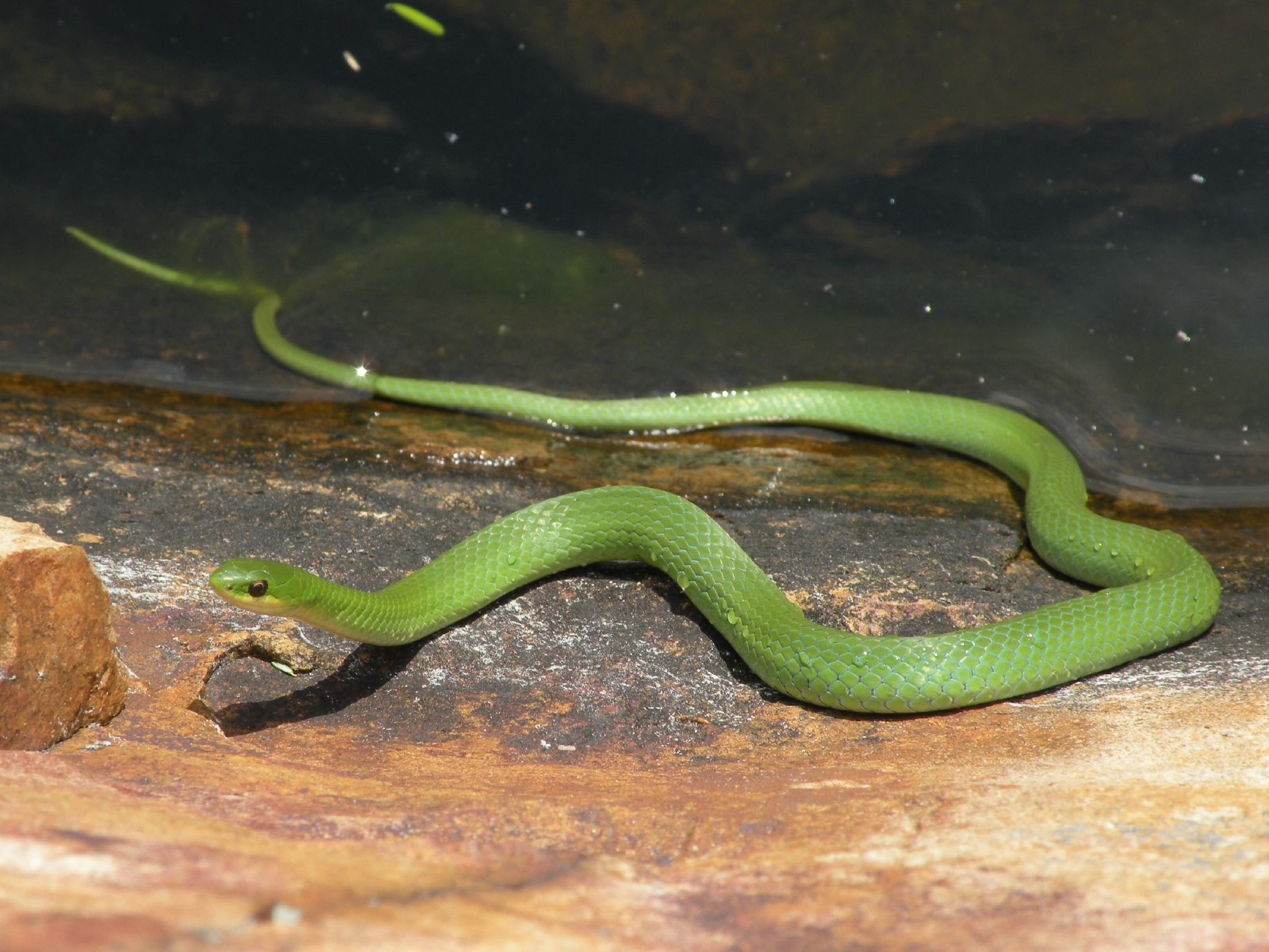

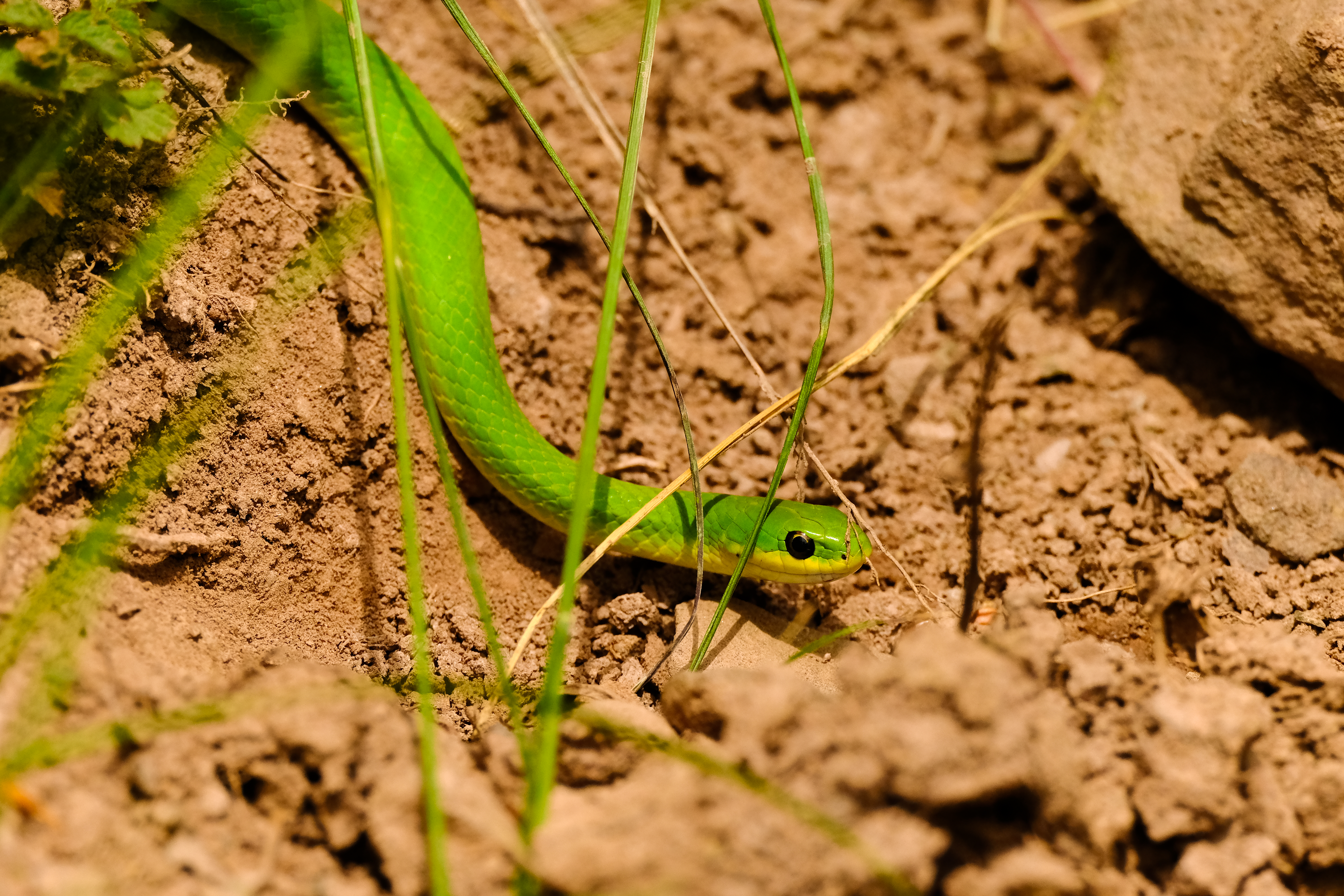

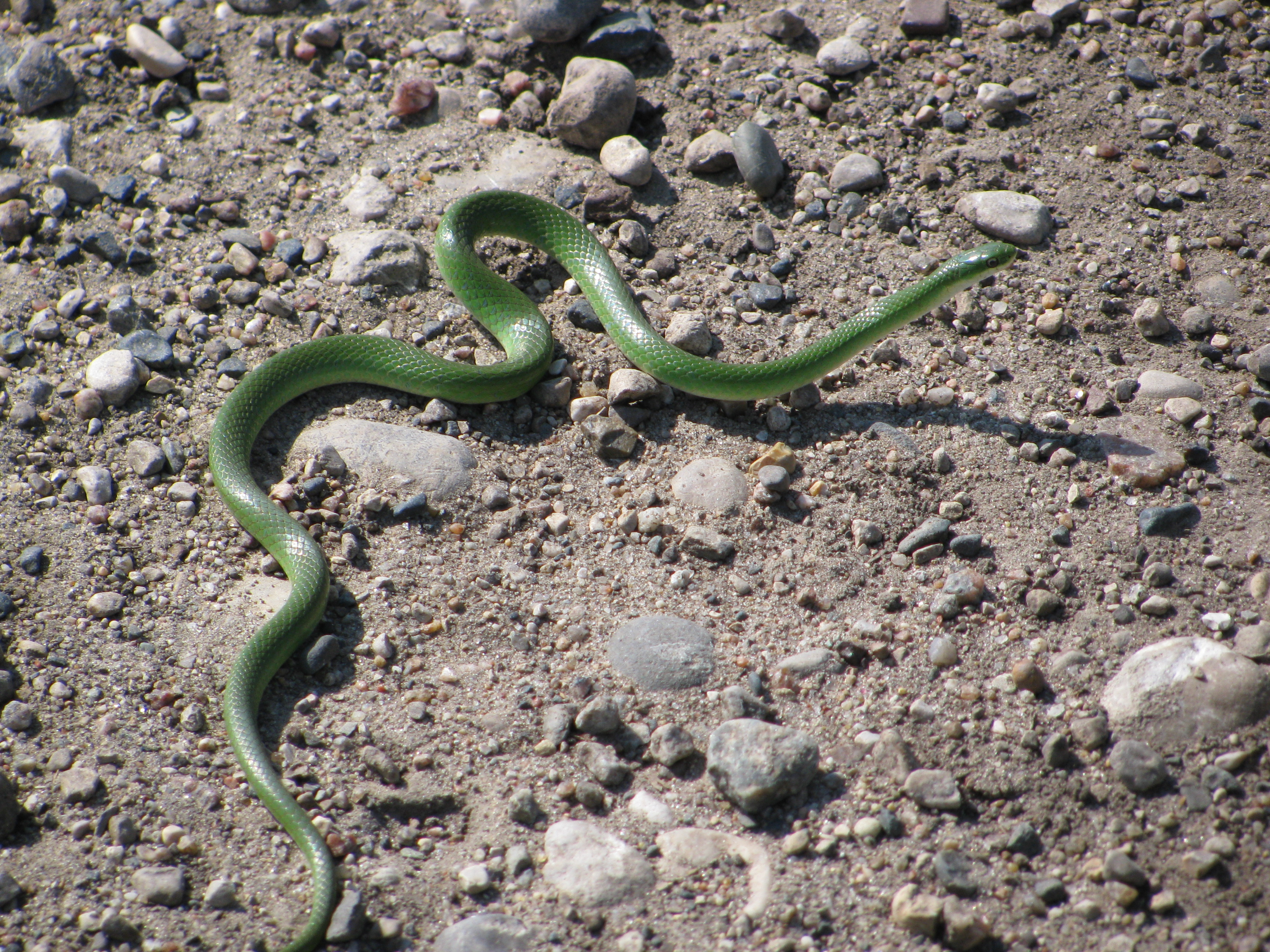

== Subspecies ==
- Eastern smooth green snake, Opheodrys vernalis vernalis (Harlan, 1827)
- Western smooth green snake, Opheodrys vernalis blanchardi Grobman, 1941
- Northern smooth green snake, Opheodrys vernalis borealis Grobman, 1992

Nota bene: A trinomial authority in parentheses indicates that the subspecies was originally described in a genus other than Opheodrys.

== Etymology ==
The subspecific name, blanchardi, is in honor of American herpetologist Frank N. Blanchard.

== Geographic range ==
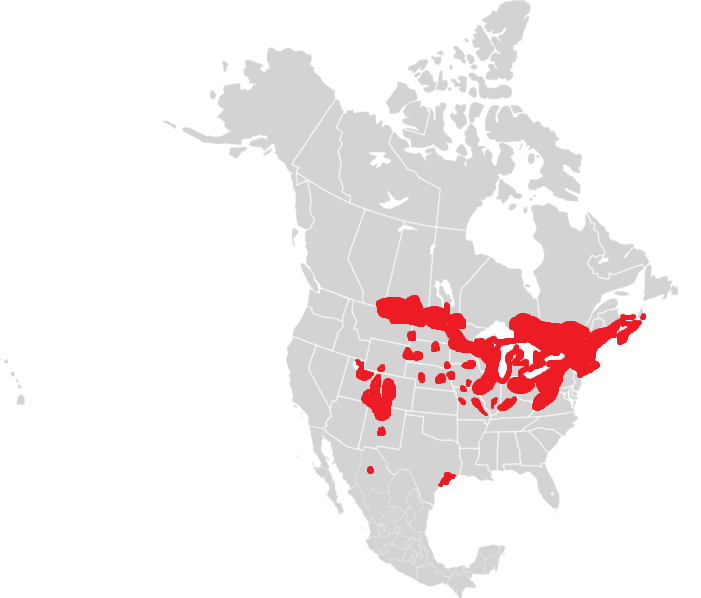

The smooth green snake is native to the Nearctic region. The range spreads through southeastern Canada, west to Saskatchewan, and south through Illinois and Virginia. It can also be found in other areas, such as in Wyoming, Colorado, New Mexico, Iowa, Missouri, Texas, and Northern Mexico.

== Threats ==
O. vernalis is hunted by various predators, including the red-tailed hawk, great blue heron, rough-legged buzzard, bears, raccoons, foxes, and the common house cat. Humans often find these snakes in the wild and keep them as pets. It is subjected to commercial collection because of its attractive skin coloration, passive nature, and small size. However, this snake is not known to survive well in captivity. Because its populations are usually isolated and small in size, this commercial collection can greatly affect the overall population.

The smooth green snake population is also declining due to the use of pesticides, as well as destruction of habitats. Pesticides are particularly harmful to the snake when used in riparian areas, mountain foothills and meadows. Because the smooth green snake's diet consists mainly of insects, insecticides put the snake at great risk in areas where they are applied. The reduction of its prey is a major cause of the death of the snakes, as well as one of the most important natural threats to its population.

Habitat destruction is caused by road building, logging, cattle grazing, and the draining of streams. Logging and mining conducted in a smooth green snake habitat can be a source of snake mortality. Roads and highways are a major cause of deaths, especially those near streams or other habitats the snake occupies. Livestock grazing has been found to reduce snake populations in some areas, where five times the amount of snakes were found on ungrazed areas, compared to grazed areas. The effects of livestock grazing include the reduction of grass, changes in tree species, compaction of soil, and more erosion, which affect the reptile population in these areas. Flooding, freezing, and destruction of dens can destroy large numbers of smooth green snakes, as well as other species of snake with which it may hibernate.

Human recreational activities, such as off-road vehicles near wetlands, are also damaging its habitat. Lakes and streams are enjoyable areas for recreation, but human activity in these areas can degrade them. The use of off-road vehicles in or around wetlands, however, is the most damaging recreational activity. Mud bogging significantly damages and destroys these areas. Also, oil and gasoline from off-road vehicles has been found in snake habitats.

== Conservation status ==
The smooth green snake is of least concern in terms of conservation, but the concern is increasing in the U.S. with some states citing anecdotal evidence of fewer sightings and residential sprawl. While there is some research showing the population of the snake is declining, only a small number of states (Iowa, Missouri, Indiana, Michigan, North Carolina, Montana, Wyoming, Nebraska, Colorado and Texas) protect the smooth green snake with conservation laws. This law prohibits commercial collection of the snake and collection by individuals.

== Habitat ==
O. vernalis can be found in many different habitats, including marshes, meadows, the edges of streams, and open woods. It prefers to be on the ground, in open areas without a lot of shrubs. During hibernation, the smooth green snake looks for burrows, ant hills, and other dug-out underground areas, normally gathering in large numbers. It prefers moist habitats and areas near permanent water sources, usually staying in green areas for camouflage. Being cold blooded, it prefers warm areas, lying in the sun on rocks and logs, also using them for hiding.

== Behavior ==
The smooth green snake relies on an environment matching its green scales for camouflage to protect itself from predators. If threatened, a smooth green snake will usually flee. It is a docile snake, seldom biting and usually allowing humans to come close. If provoked, it can secrete a substance from its anal gland, causing a foul smell. When handled by humans, it usually shows excited behavior and calms down after wrapping itself around a finger. When it hunts, it turns its head from side to side, finding prey with its tongue. The flicking of the tongue gathers air near the snake's head, and the Jacobson's organ (on the roof of its mouth) interprets the airborne pheromones and chemical signals. The green snake has no ears, relying on vibrations to figure out its surroundings. Its sight is relatively strong, at least over short distances. Due to the stretchy ligaments in its jaw, it can swallow prey whole, even prey that is larger than its own body diameter. It can shed its skin as often as every four to five weeks, allowing for new growth.

During months when the weather is warmer, the smooth green snake tends to be active both day and night; in the colder, winter months, it hibernates in social groups. Ant hills and burrows of other animals are used during hibernation as part-time homes.

== Diet ==
The smooth green snake mostly eats insects and spiders, including spineless caterpillars, harvestmen, moths, ants, snails, worms, and slugs. While hunting, it uses both chemical and visual clues to find prey, and kills with a strike instead of constriction.

== Reproduction ==
Sexually mature smooth green snakes mate in the late spring or summer, and gravid females lay eggs from June to September. Usually, two clutches are laid, each containing four to six eggs. Females usually lay their eggs in rodent burrows, mounds of rotting vegetation, sawdust piles, or rotting logs. In the northern habitats of this species, communal nesting has been observed. Smooth green snake eggs are white and oval; they have thin shells and are about one inch (2.5 cm) in length. Each egg has an average mass of 2.6 grams. The eggs hatch four to 23 days after being laid.

== Bibliography ==
- Conant, Roger (1975). A Field Guide to Reptiles and Amphibians of Eastern and Central North America (2nd ed.). Boston: Houghton Mifflin. ISBN 0-395-19977-8.
- Schmidt, K.P.; Davis, D.D. (1941). Field Book of Snakes of the United States and Canada. New York: G.P. Putnam's Sons.
- Smith, H.M.; Brodie, E.D. Jr. (1982). Reptiles of North America: A Guide to Field Identification. New York: Golden Press. ISBN 0-307-13666-3.
- Wright, A.H.; Wright, A.A. (1957). Handbook of Snakes of the United States and Canada. Ithaca and London: Comstock.
