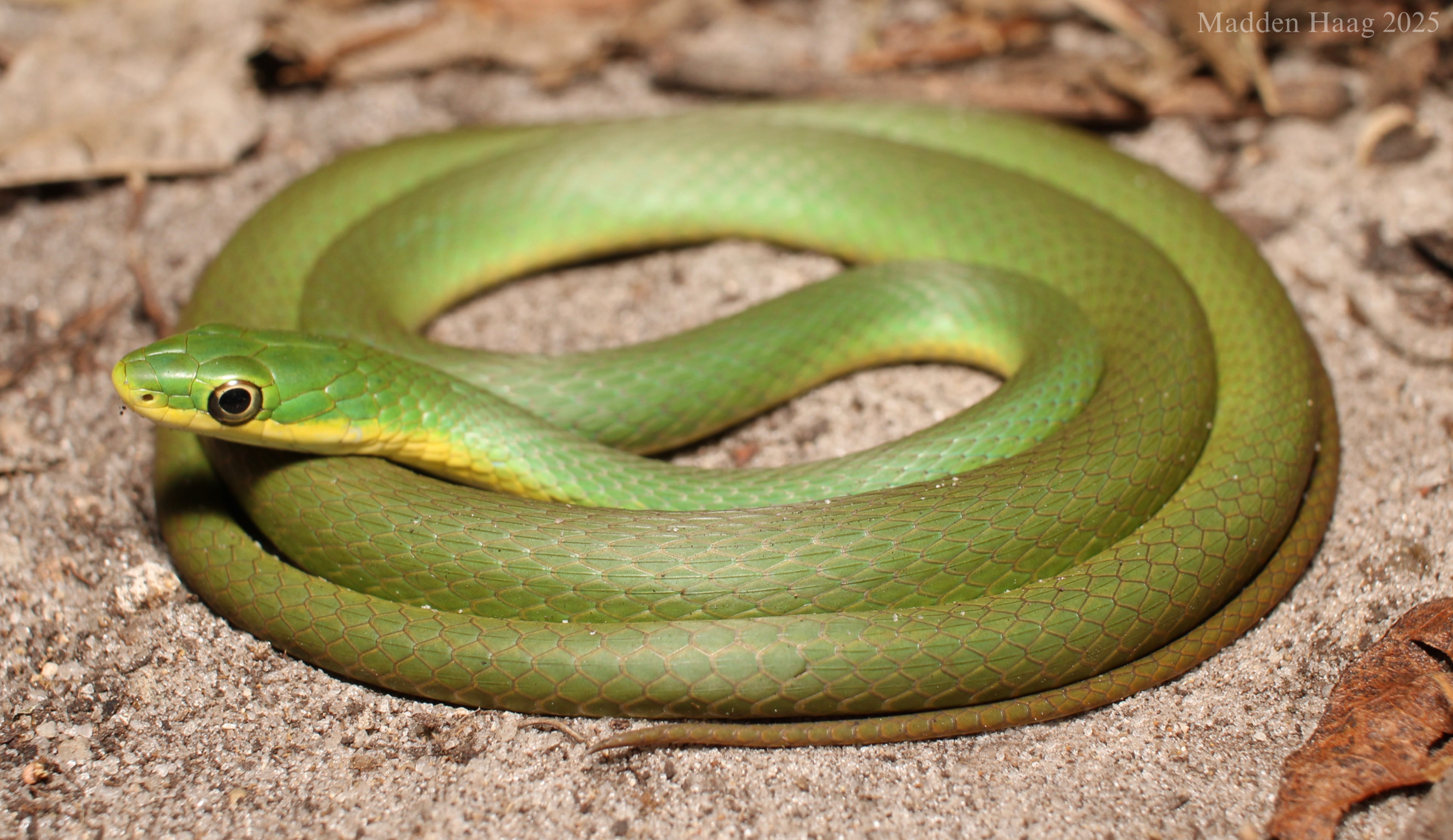
- Rough green snake (Opheodrys aestivus)

Conservation status
- Least Concern (IUCN 3.1)

Scientific classification
- Kingdom: Animalia
- Phylum: Chordata
- Class: Reptilia
- Order: Squamata
- Suborder: Serpentes
- Family: Colubridae
- Genus: Opheodrys
- Species: O. aestivus

Binomial name
- Opheodrys aestivus (Linnaeus, 1766)
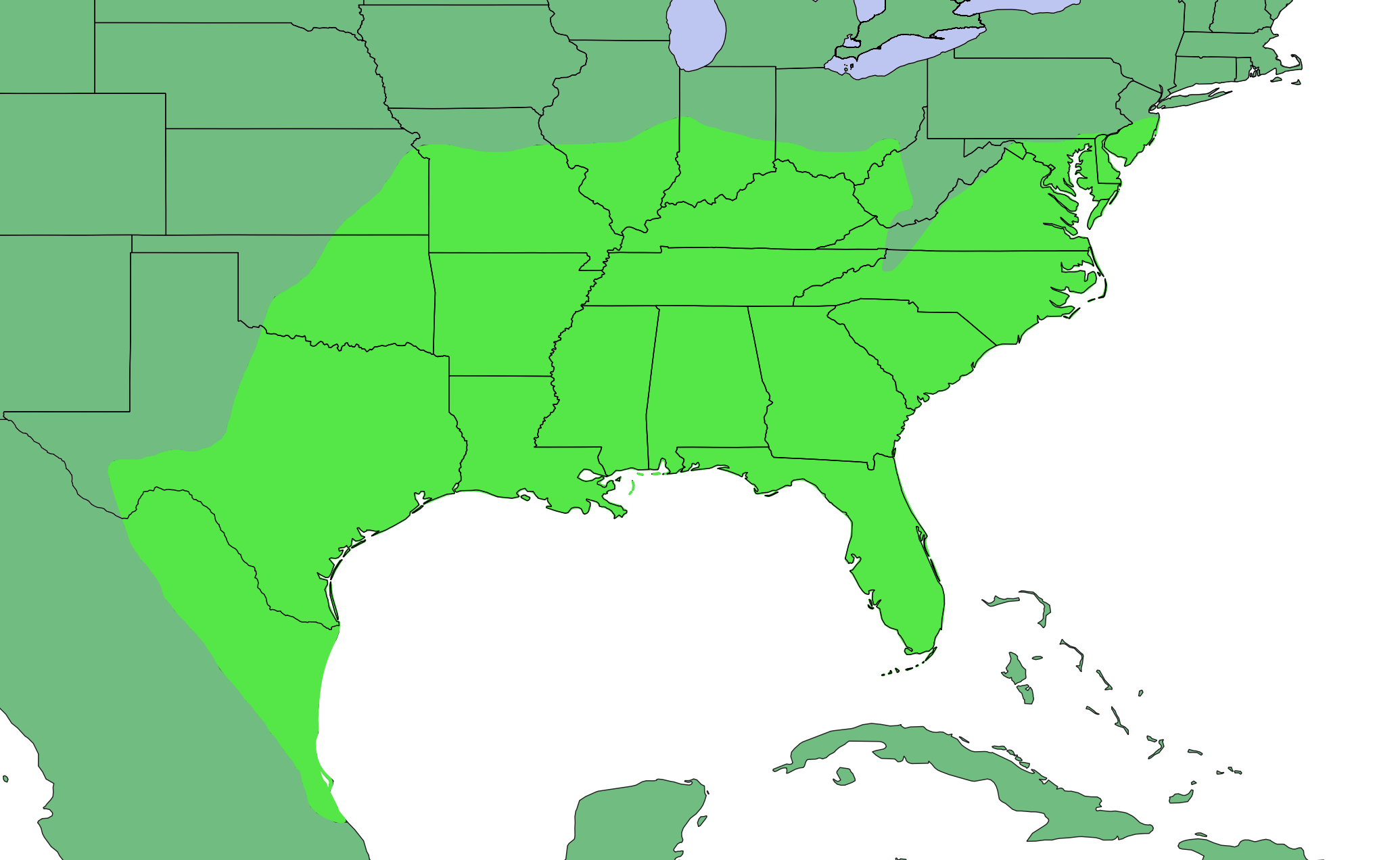

Synonyms
- List: Coluber æstivus Linnaeus, 1766; Leptophis æstivus — Bell, 1826; Herpetodryas æstivus — Schlegel, 1837; Cyclophis æstivus — Günther, 1858; Opheodrys æstivus — Cope, 1860; Liopeltis æstivus — Jan, 1863; Phyllophilophis æstivus — Garman, 1892; Contia æstiva — Boulenger, 1894; Opheodrys aestivus — Stejneger & Barbour, 1917

= Opheodrys aestivus =

Species of snake

Opheodrys aestivus, commonly known as the rough green snake, is a species of nonvenomous North American snake in the subfamily Colubrinae of the family Colubridae. The species is sometimes called grass snake or green grass snake, but these names are more commonly applied to the smooth green snake (Opheodrys vernalis). The European colubrid called grass snake (Natrix natrix) is not closely related. The rough green snake is docile, often allowing close approach by humans, and rarely bites. Even when bites occur, they have no venom and are harmless.

== Description ==
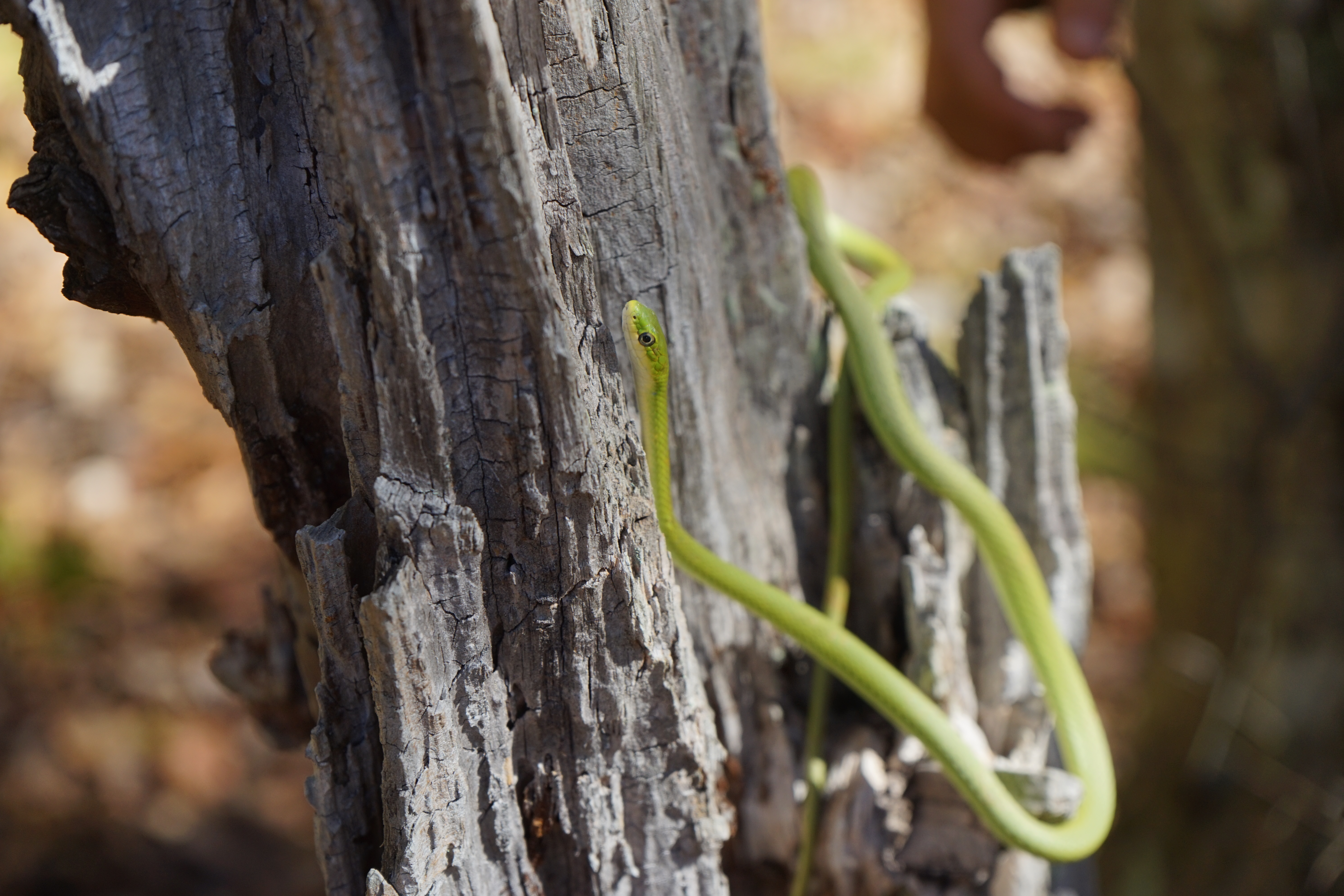
O. aestivus, rough green snake

The rough green snake (Opheodrys aestivus) is bright green above and has a yellowish belly, affording it excellent camouflage in green vegetation and making it difficult to see in the wild even though it is relatively common in its habitat. It has keeled dorsal scales, which are arranged in 17 rows at mid-body. It grows up to 116 cm (45 3/4 in) in total length (tail included) and is very thin.

== Etymology ==
The specific name, aestivus, is Latin for "summer" in reference to the species' green dorsal color. The generic name, Opheodrys, is derived from Greek ophios, meaning "serpent", and drys, "tree".

== Geographic range ==
The rough green snake ranges throughout the Southeastern United States, from Florida, north to Southern New Jersey, Indiana, and west to Central Texas. At the edge of the species' population, in states such as New Jersey, Indiana, and Kansas, it is often isolated and dependent on locally humid microclimates. The snake is commonly found in the Piedmont and Atlantic coastal plain, but is not found in the higher elevations of the Appalachian Mountains. It is also found in northeastern Mexico, including the state of Tamaulipas and eastern Nuevo León.

== Habitat and behavior ==
The preferred natural habitat of Opheodrys aestivus is moist meadows and woodlands, typically near water. It is highly arboreal, and prefers a narrow arboreal microhabitat of dense brush in edge situations. This microhabitat is found in a variety of habitats, such as lakeshores, streambanks, and upland ravines. The rough green snake also commonly uses disturbed edge habitats alongside roads for thermoregulation and refuge. If kept in captivity it is recommended that it be in a taller enclosure with plenty of cover and climbing opportunities. It is frequently found climbing in low vegetation, and is also a good swimmer. However, it is often found on the ground as well. Unlike many snakes, it is largely diurnal. At night it is found coiled in the branches of trees. Preference is given to perches based upon distance from the shoreline, height of branches, and thickness of the individual branch.

== Diet ==
Opheodrys aestivus is a dietary specialist, preying on insects and other arthropods. The diet of O. aestivus consists mostly of insects and other terrestrial arthropods, but some snails and tree frogs are also eaten. This snake is not a constrictor; most prey are grabbed and overpowered by its jaws which are unusually strong for a snake. O. aestivus has been shown to rely heavily on visual cues for prey detection and to prefer living prey items. As foraging activity increases, the tongue evolves greater elongation and deeper forking, and the abundance of chemoreceptors rises in the vomeronasal organs, the chemosensory responsiveness is adjusted to match diet. Orthopterans constitute 16.9% and all arthropods about 98% of dietary volume of the rough green snake. The rough green snake exhibits greater chemosensory investigation of chemical cues from its insect prey than from representatives of other taxa because of the linked importance of insects to its diet. It is able to live away from standing water by sucking droplets of dew from leaves.

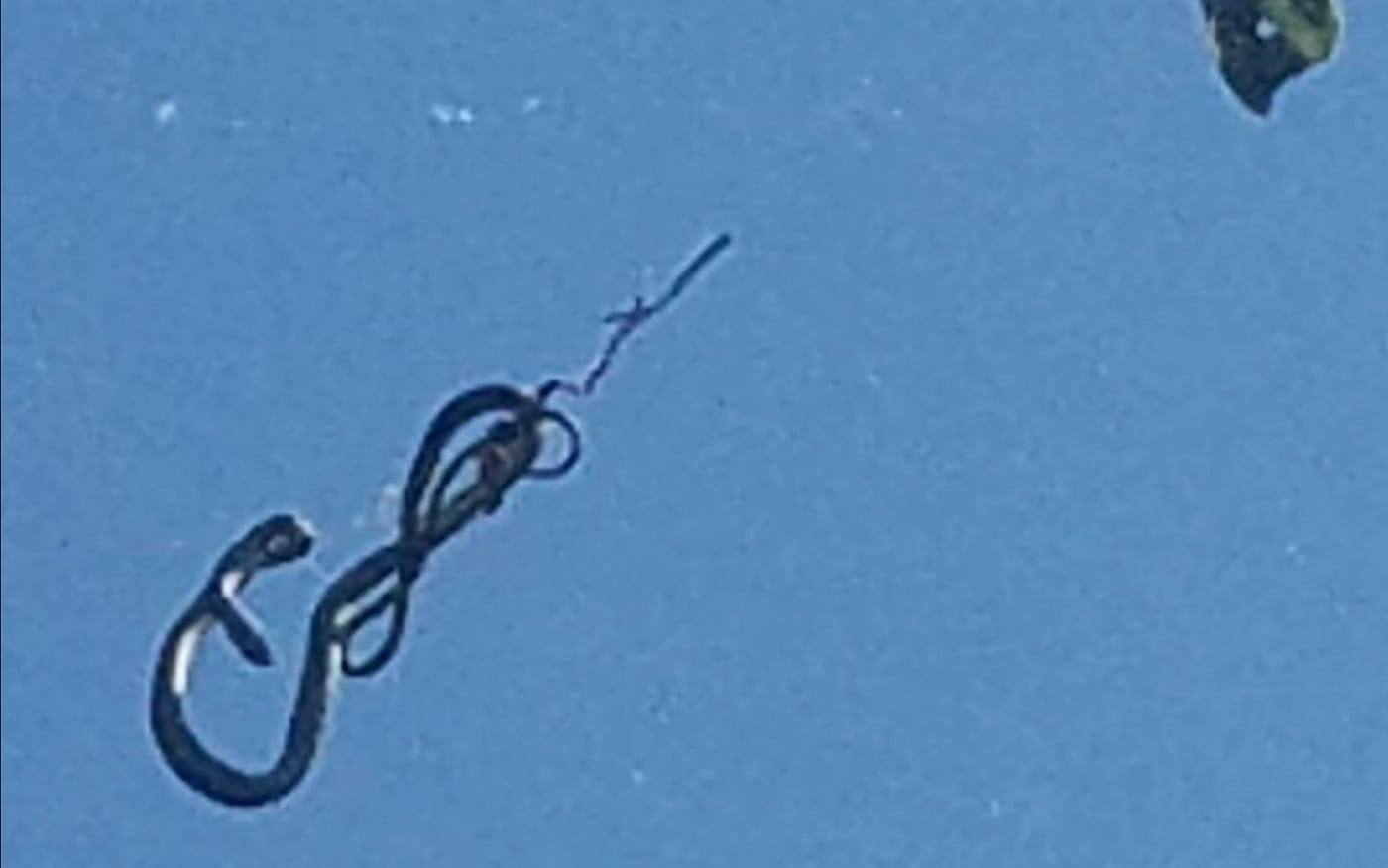
O. aestivus, rough green snake, spotted in St. Tammany Parish, Louisiana caught in the web of a golden silk orb-weaver

== As prey ==
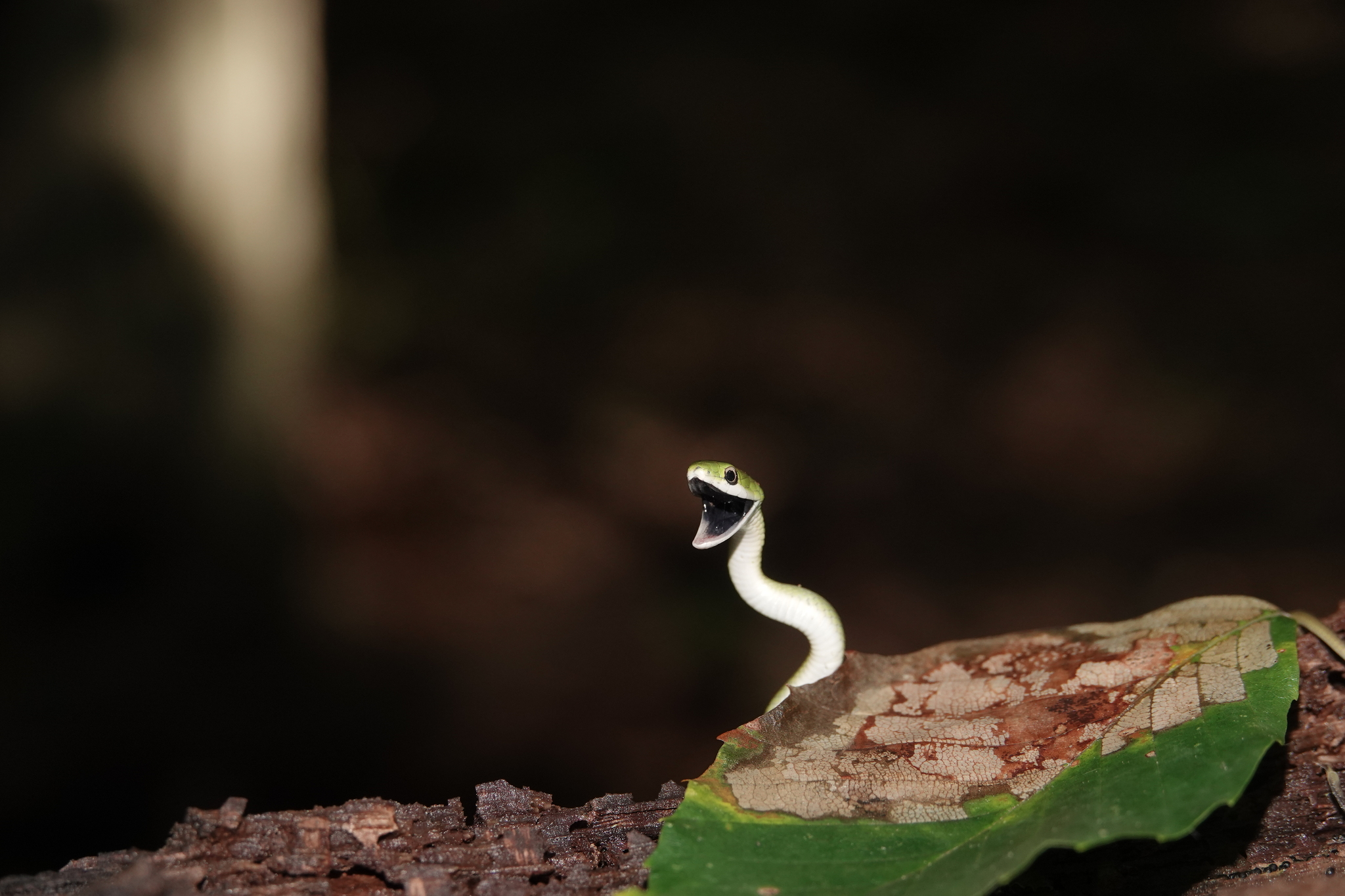
Showing the black mouth

Predators of the rough green snake include birds and other snakes, such as the eastern racer (Coluber constrictor) and the eastern king snake (Lampropeltis getula). It can also be infested by parasites including species of the genus Cryptosporidium. The rough green snake does not exhibit any predator-resistance capabilities besides fleeing, however it relies heavily on its camouflage. It often undergoes a lot of stress due to human presence.

== Reproduction ==
The male rough green snake reaches sexual maturity at an age of two years, and a snout-to-vent length (SVL) of around 24.5 cm (9.6 in). The female reaches sexual maturity around one or two years of age, or when it attains a length of 35–40 cm (14–16 in). For the male, plasma androgen levels and the diameter of the sexual segment of the kidney have a bimodal cycle with one peak in the spring and the second in late summer. Spermatogenesis occurs in June, reaching its peak in July and August. This is a post-nuptial cycle. The rough green snake breeds in spring, and sometimes again in fall. Courtship behaviors expressed by the male include head-jerking, tail-waving, and chin-rubbing. The male aligns its copulatory organs (hemipenes) with the female in an average of 2 minutes and 45 seconds, and copulation averages 16 minutes and 4 seconds. The female lays 2–14 eggs, occasionally in a communal nest shared by more than one female. Up to 75 eggs have been found in one such nest. The nest site varies: under boards, under bark in rotting stumps, in deep mulch, or under a rock. Hatchlings from spring breeding typically emerge in August or September, and each has a total length (tail included) of about 18–20 cm (7.1–7.9 in). At maturity, the male begins storing abundant amounts of sperm in its vas deferens. It is able to mate in the spring of the next year (third year of life).

== Conservation status ==
The rough green snake is widespread and is not of conservation concern. However, urban development, especially the reduction of vegetation near waterways, may reduce its numbers. Many are killed on roads, and it may be susceptible to poisoning by pesticides used on its insect prey. When dead, it turns blue. It is also one of the most exploited pet snakes in North America. Opheodrys aestivus is collected by the hundreds each year.

== Subspecies ==
- Opheodrys aestivus aestivus (Linnaeus, 1766) – northern rough green snake
- Opheodrys aestivus carinatus Grobman, 1984 – Florida rough green snake

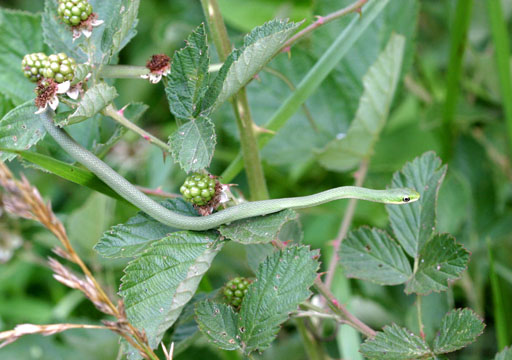
O. aestivus climbing over vegetation

== External links and further reading ==
- Aardema et al. Amphibians and Reptiles of North Carolina. Accessed 29 May 2006.
- Conant, Roger, and Joseph T. Collins (1998). A Field Guide to Reptiles & Amphibians of Eastern and Central North America. Third Edition, Expanded. Boston: Houghton Mifflin. xiv + 616 pp. ISBN 0-395-90452-8.
- Cook, Will. Carolina Nature. Accessed 29 May 2006.
- Gibbons, Whit, Michael E. Dorcas (2005). Snakes Of The Southeast. Athens, Georgia: University of Georgia Press. ISBN 0-8203-2652-6.
- Linnaeus, C. (1766). Systema naturæ per regna tria naturæ, secundum classes, ordines, genera, species, cum characteribus, differentiis, synonymis, locis. Tomus I. Editio Duodecima, Reformata [Twelfth Edition, Revised]. Stockholm: L. Salvius. 532 pp. (Coluber æstivus, new species, p. 387). (in Latin).
- Martof, Bernard S., William M. Palmer, Joseph R. Bailey, Julian R. Harrison III (1980). Amphibians and Reptiles of the Carolinas and Virginia. (Photographs by Jack Dermid). Chapel Hill: University of North Carolina Press. 264 pp. ISBN 0-8078-4252-4. (Opheodrys aestivus, p. 224).
- Myers, P., R. Espinosa, C.S. Parr, T. Jones, G.S. Hammond, and T.A. Dewey (2006). Animal Diversity Web. Accessed May 29, 2006.
- Palmer, William M., Alvin L. Braswell, Renaldo Kuhler (1995). Reptiles of North Carolina. Chapel Hill: University of North Carolina Press. ISBN 0-8078-2158-6.
- Powell, Robert, Roger Conant, Joseph T. Collins (2016). Peterson Field Guide to Reptiles and Amphibians of Eastern and Central North America, Fourth Edition. Boston and New York: Houghton Mifflin Harcourt. xiv + 494 pp., 47 plates, 207 figures. ISBN 978-0-544-12997-9. (Opheodrys aestivus, p. 382 + Plate 35).
- Schmidt, K.P., and D.D. Davis (1941). Field Book of Snakes of the United States and Canada. New York: G.P. Putnam's Sons. 365 pp. (Opheodrys aestivus, pp. 118–120, Figure 27 + p. 332, Plate 12).
- University of Georgia, Savannah River Ecological Laboratory, Animal Fact Sheets. Accessed 1 June 2006.
- University of Georgia, Savannah River Ecological Laboratory, Reptiles and Amphibians of South Carolina and Georgia. Accessed 1 June 2006.
- Wright, A.H., and A.A. Wright (1957). Handbook of Snakes of the United States and Canada. Ithaca and London: Comstock. 1,105 pp. (in 2 volumes) (Opheodrys aestivus, pp. 551–555, Map 43, Figure 164).
