= Doria's green snake =

Conservation status
- Least Concern (IUCN 3.1)

Scientific classification
- Kingdom: Animalia
- Phylum: Chordata
- Class: Reptilia
- Order: Squamata
- Suborder: Serpentes
- Family: Colubridae
- Genus: Ptyas
- Species: P. doriae

Binomial name
- Ptyas doriae Boulenger, 1888

Synonyms
- Cyclophiops doriae Boulenger, 1888; Ablabes doriae — Boulenger, 1890; Liopeltis doriae — Wall, 1924; Eurypholis doriae — Pope, 1935; Entechinus doriae — Cundall, 1981; Cyclophiops doriae — Zhao & Adler, 1993; Ophiodrys [sic] doriae — Das, 1996; Opheodrys doriae — Sharma, 2004; Ptyas doriae — Figueroa et al., 2016

Species of snake

Doria's green snake (Ptyas doriae) is a species of snake in the family Colubridae. The species is endemic to Asia.

== Etymology ==
The specific name, doriae, is in honor of Italian naturalist Giacomo Doria.

== Geographic range ==
P. doriae is found in southwestern China (Yunnan), northeastern India (Assam), and northern Myanmar (Kachin Hills).

== Habitat ==
The preferred natural habitats of P. doriae are forest, shrubland, and grassland, at altitudes of 600–1,780 m (1,970–5,840 ft).

== Description ==
P. doriae may attain a total length of 91 cm (36 in), which includes a tail 21 cm (8.3 in) long. It is greenish dorsally, and whitish ventrally. The upper lip is also whitish. The dorsal scales are smooth, without apical pits, and arranged in 15 rows throughout the length of the body.

== Behavior ==
P. doriae is diurnal and partly arboreal.

== Reproduction ==
P. doriae is oviparous.
