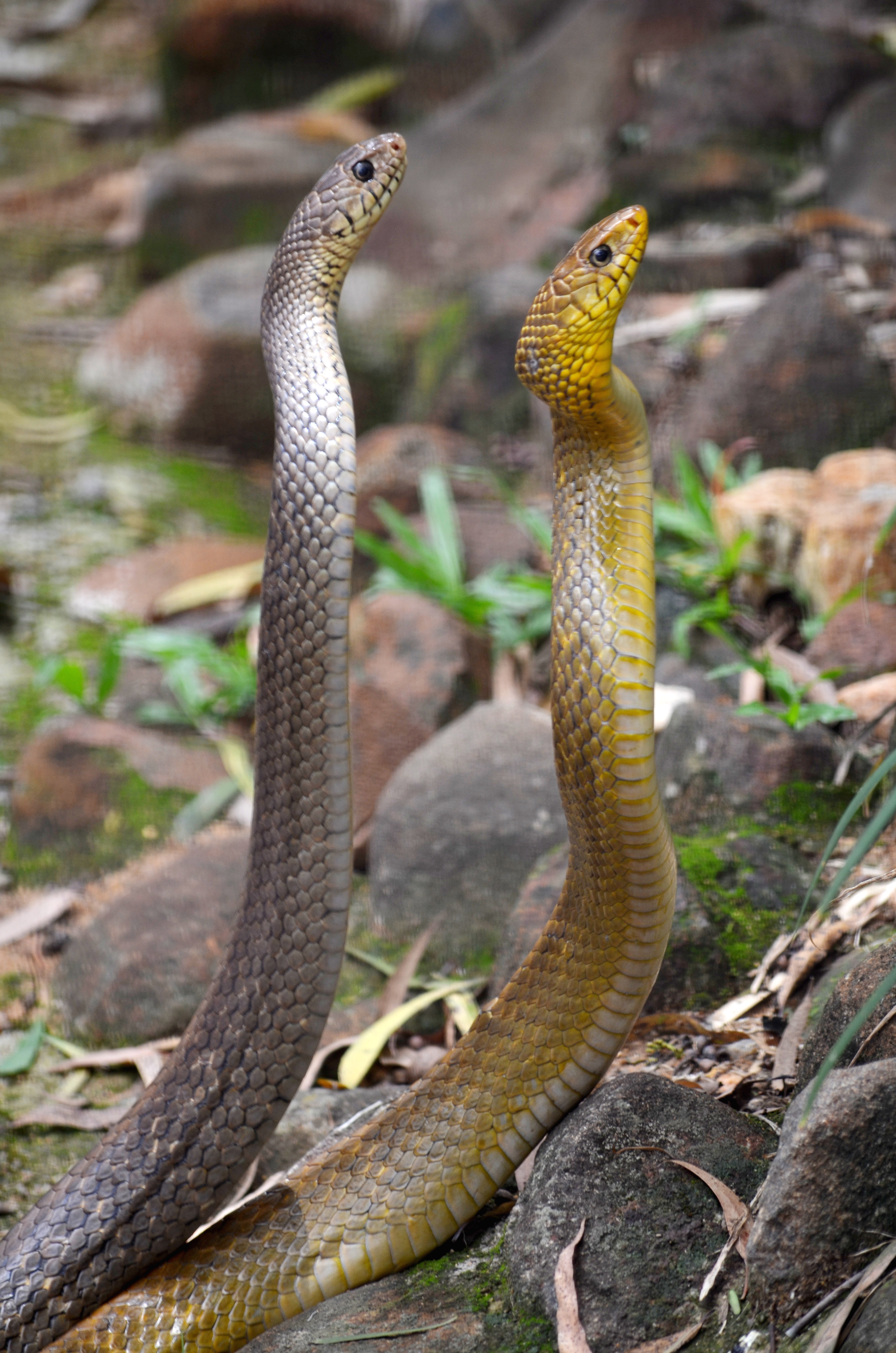
- Ptyas mucosa

Scientific classification
- Kingdom: Animalia
- Phylum: Chordata
- Class: Reptilia
- Order: Squamata
- Suborder: Serpentes
- Family: Colubridae
- Subfamily: Colubrinae
- Genus: Ptyas; Fitzinger, 1843

Species
- 13, see text

Synonyms
- Cyclophiops Boulenger, 1888; Zaocys Cope, 1860

= Ptyas =

Genus of snakes

Ptyas is a genus of colubrid snakes. This genus is one of several colubrid genera colloquially called "rat snakes" or "ratsnakes".

The generic name derives from Ancient Greek πτυάς, meaning "spitter", which referred to a kind of snake believed to spit venom in the eyes of humans, although in reality none of the Ptyas are known to spit venom.

== Species ==
13 species are recognized:

- Ptyas bachmaensis (Nguyen, Vo, Orlov, Phan, Le, Nguyen, Tran, Murphy & Che, 2024) – Bach ma green rat snake
- Ptyas carinata (Günther, 1858) – keeled rat snake
- Ptyas dhumnades (Cantor, 1842) – Cantor's rat snake
- Ptyas dipsas (Schlegel, 1837) – Sulawesi black racer
- Ptyas doriae Boulenger, 1888 – Doria's green snake
- Ptyas fusca (Günther, 1858) – white-bellied rat snake, brown rat snake
- Ptyas herminae (Boettger, 1895) – Sakishima green snake
- Ptyas korros (Schlegel, 1837) – Chinese ratsnake, Indo-Chinese ratsnake
- Ptyas luzonensis (Günther, 1873) – smooth-scaled mountain rat snake
- Ptyas major (Günther, 1858) – Chinese green snake
- Ptyas mucosa (Linnaeus, 1758) – Oriental rat snake, Indian rat snake
- Ptyas multicincta (Roux, 1907) – many-banded green snake, North China green snake
- Ptyas nigromarginata (Blyth, 1854) – green rat snake, black-bordered rat snake
- Ptyas semicarinata (Hallowell, 1861) – Ryukyu green snake
