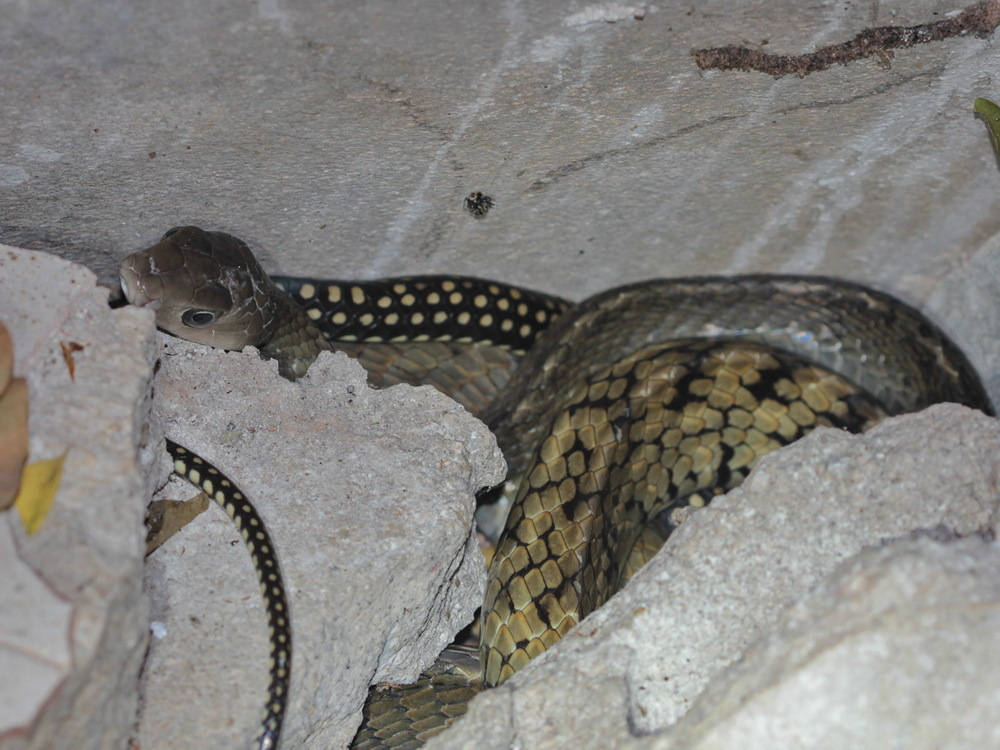

Conservation status
- Least Concern (IUCN 3.1)

Scientific classification
- Kingdom: Animalia
- Phylum: Chordata
- Class: Reptilia
- Order: Squamata
- Suborder: Serpentes
- Family: Colubridae
- Genus: Ptyas
- Species: P. carinatus

Binomial name
- Ptyas carinatus (Günther, 1858)

Synonyms
- Zaocys (Zapyrus) carinatus - Boettger 1887; Zaocys tenasserimensis - Sclater 1891; Zaocys carinatus — Boulenger 1893; Ptyas carinatus — Wall 1923; Zaocys carinatus — M.A. Smith 1943; Zaocys carinatus — Grandison 1978; Ptyas carinatus — David & Vogel 1996; Zaocys carinatus — Manthey & Grossmann 1997; Ptyas carinatus — Cox et al. 1998; Zaocys carinatus — Grismer et al. 2002; Zaocys carinatus — Rooijen & Rooijen 2002; Ptyas carinatus — Malkmus et al. 2002; Ptyas carinata — David & Das 2004

= Ptyas carinata =

Keeled Rat Snake

Species of snake

Ptyas carinata, commonly known as the keeled rat snake, also called King koros is a species of colubrid snake. It is found in Indonesia, Myanmar, Malaysia, Thailand, Philippines, Cambodia, Vietnam, Laos and Singapore. This little known species is probably the largest extant species in the diverse colubrid family that includes just over half of living snake species. Known adult lengths of snakes of this species in Taiwan measured anywhere from 1.21 to 2.75 m (4 ft 0 in to 9 ft 0 in). However, the reportedly maximum size was about 4 m (13 ft 1 in). Males reportedly average slightly larger than females. They are probably opportunistic predators on a variety of prey, such as rodents, though adult lizards are thought to be significant prey in Indonesia.
