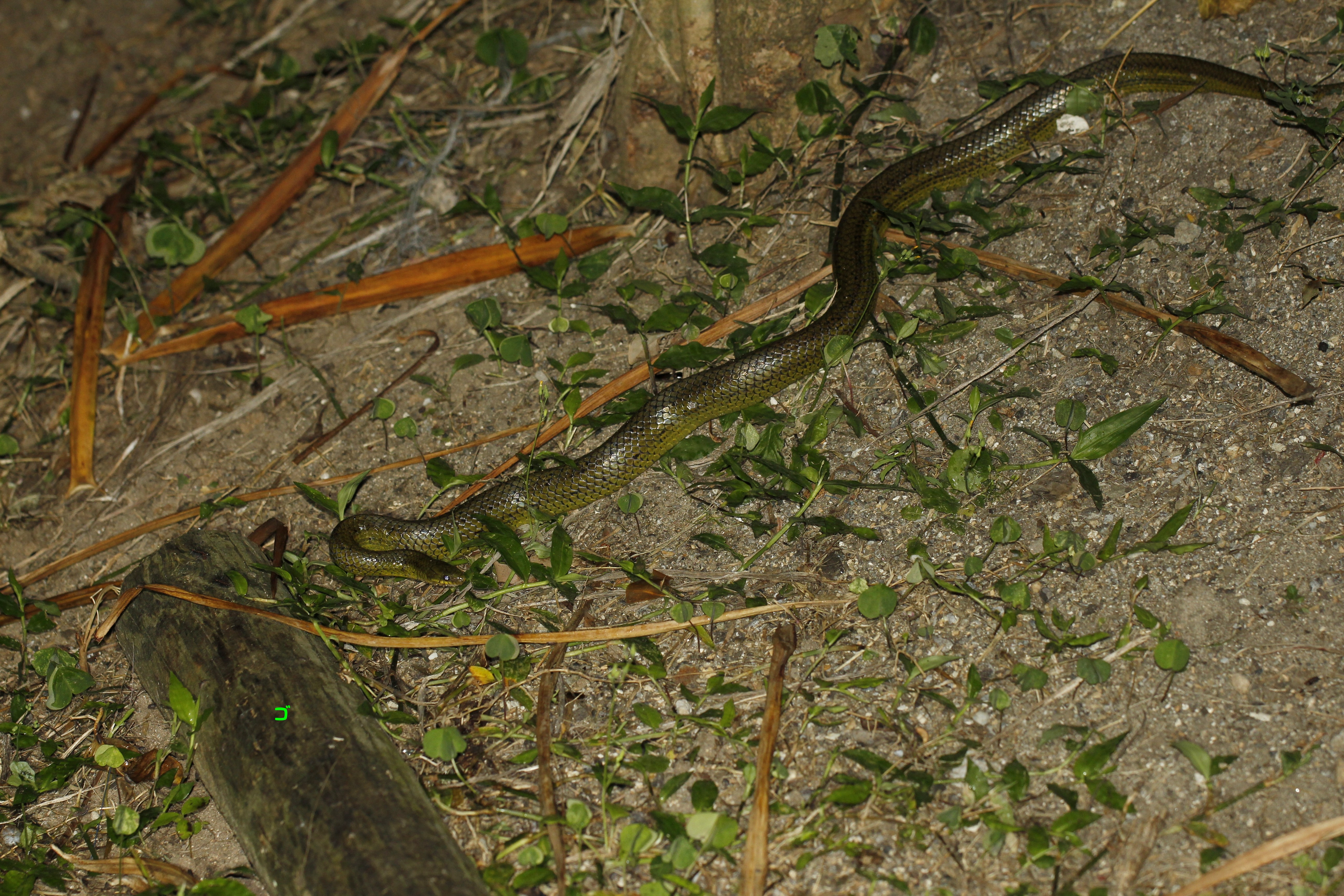

Conservation status
- Least Concern (IUCN 3.1)

Scientific classification
- Kingdom: Animalia
- Phylum: Chordata
- Class: Reptilia
- Order: Squamata
- Suborder: Serpentes
- Family: Colubridae
- Genus: Ptyas
- Species: P. herminae

Binomial name
- Ptyas herminae (Boettger, 1895)

Synonyms
- List: Ablabes herminae Boettger, 1895; Liopeltis herminae — Stejneger, 1907; Entichinus herminae — Cundall, 1981; Opheodrys herminae —, Eurypholis herminae —, Cyclophiops herminae — Toriba, 1989; Ptyas herminae — Figueroa et al., 2016

= Sakishima green snake =

Sakashima Green Snake

Species of snake

The Sakishima green snake (Ptyas herminae) is a species of snake in the family Colubridae. The species is endemic to the Yaeyama Islands in the southern Ryukyu Islands of Japan.

== Conservation status ==
These snakes were listed as Near Threatened on the revised 2000 Red List of Japan, but this was changed to Least Concern in a 2016 assessment.

== Etymology ==
The specific name, herminae, is in honor of Boettger's wife, Hermine Boettger.

== Geographic range ==
P. herminae is found in the Yaeyama Islands of Japan.

== Habitat ==
The preferred natural habitat of P. herminae is forest.

== Description ==
P. herminae may attain a total length of 58 cm (23 in), which includes a tail about 11 cm (4.3 in) long. They have a pointed snout, and their scales are arranged in 17 rows, and they have 17 teeth in the upper jaw, of almost equal size.

== Behavior ==
P. herminae is terrestrial.

== Diet ==
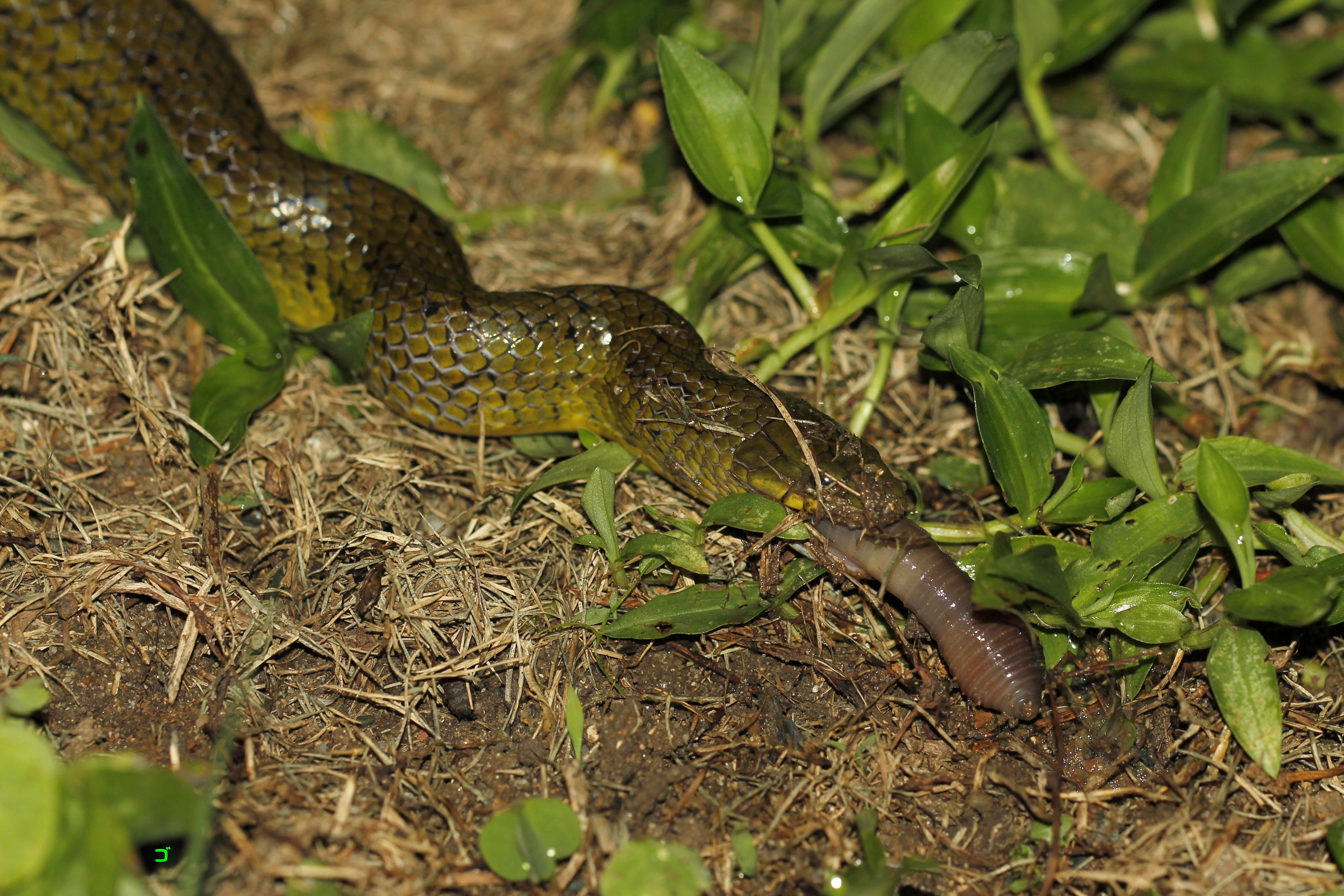
Eating a worm

P. herminae preys upon earthworms.

== Reproduction ==
P. herminae is oviparous. An adult female may lay a clutch of about eight eggs in August, which is later than other species of terrestrial snakes lay eggs in the Ryukyus.
