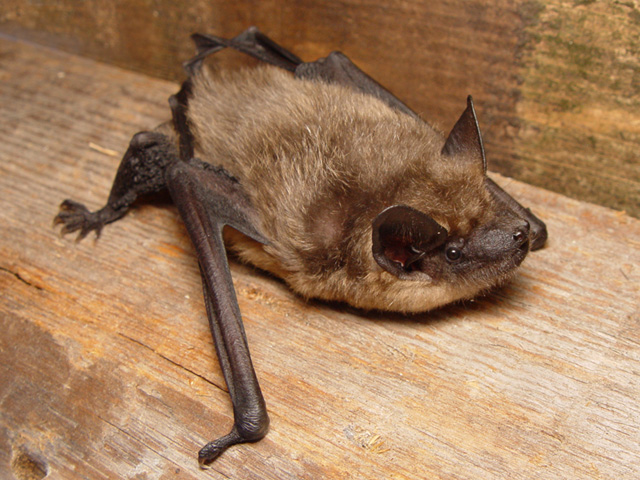
- A serotine bat, crawling across a wooden surface

Conservation status
- Least Concern (IUCN 3.1)

Scientific classification
- Kingdom: Animalia
- Phylum: Chordata
- Class: Mammalia
- Order: Chiroptera
- Family: Vespertilionidae
- Genus: Eptesicus
- Species: E. serotinus

Binomial name
- Eptesicus serotinus (Schreber, 1774)
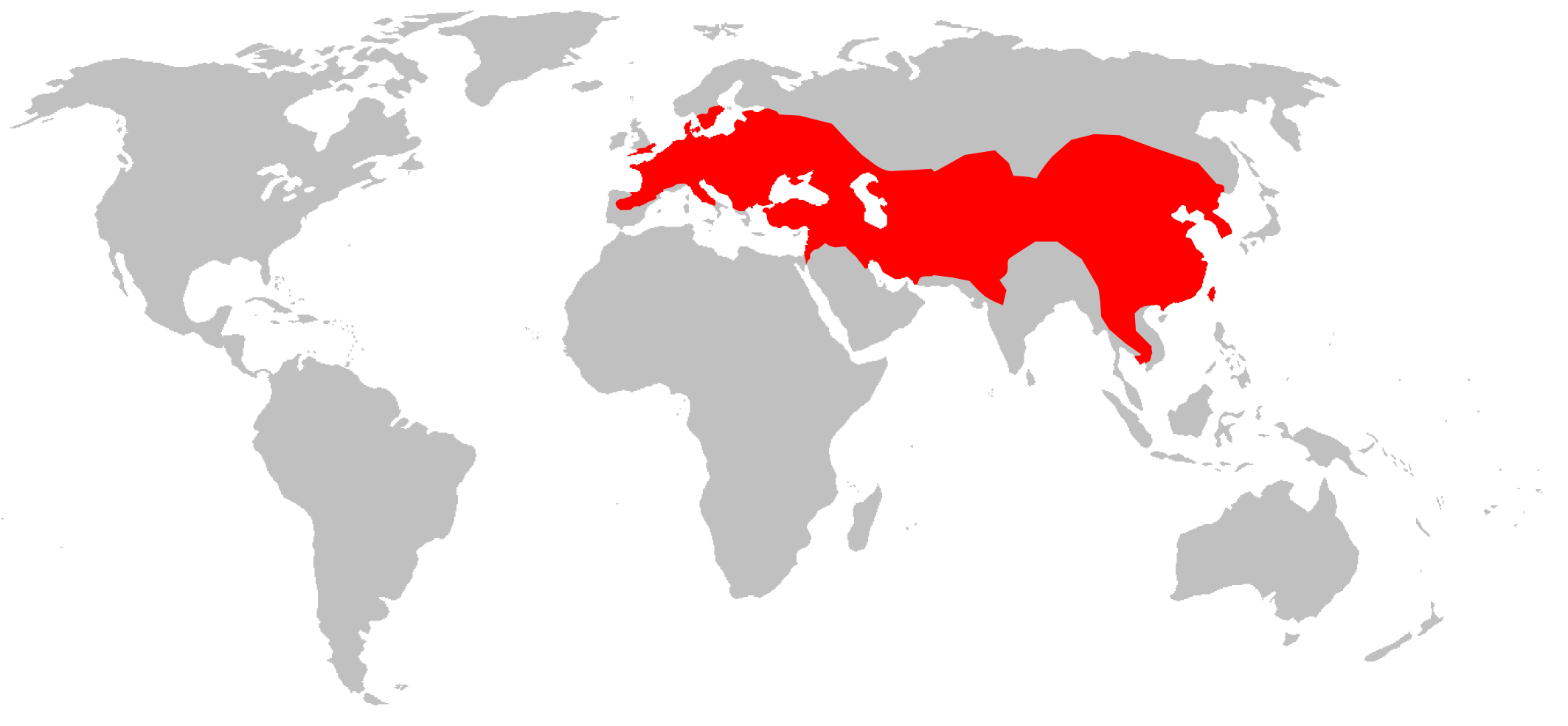
- Global range of E. serotinus (red) (includes E. pachyomus)

= Serotine bat =

Species of bat

The serotine bat (Cnephaeus serotinus) (Formerly Eptesicus serotinus), also known as the common serotine bat, eurasian serotine, big brown bat, or silky bat, is a considerably large Eurasian bat with large ears. It has a wingspan of around 37 cm (15 in) and often hunts in woodland. It sometimes roosts in buildings, hanging upside down, in small groups or individually. The name serotine is derived from the Latin serotinus, which means 'evening', while the former generic name derives from Greek ἔπιεν and οίκος, which means 'house flyer'.

== Taxonomy ==
A 2023 study concluded that the Eptesicus subgenus Cnephaeus should be elevated to genus rank.

The following subspecies have been recognised.

- Cnephaeus serotinus boscai: southern Iberia and Morocco
- Cnephaeus serotinus pashtonus: Pakistan and Afghanistan
- Cnephaeus serotinus serotinus: northern and eastern Europe and western Asia
- Cnephaeus serotinus turcomanus: central Asia and Xinjiang

The Oriental serotine (C. pachyomus) and its constituent subspecies were formerly considered a subspecies of C. serotinus, comprising its eastern populations, and is still considered its closest relative, but phylogenetic evidence indicates a deep genetic divergence between C. serotinus and C. pachyomus, so they have been split as distinct species. The same occurred with the meridional serotine (C. isabellinus), which was formerly thought to comprise the southernmost populations of C. serotinus.

== Description ==
The serotine bat has long fur which on the back is smoky-brown in colour, while the underparts are a paler yellowish-brown, the nose and triangular shaped ears are black, and the membranes of the wings are dark black or brown. The juveniles are darker than the adults. Serotine bats are easy to identify in flight, because its broad wings combined with its slow, highly manoeuvrable, flapping flight interspersed with brief glides is distinctive. The tragus has a relatively thin and pointed shape and is not kidney shaped as in Nyctalus.

== Distribution ==
The serotine bat has a Palaearctic distribution lying between about 58 degrees and 30 degrees from southern Great Britain and Spain in the west, east to along the Himalayas to northeastern India and along the Tian Shan to southern Mongolia and northern China, and south to Turkey and Iran. It has been recorded as a vagrant on Lanzarote in the Canary Islands.

== Habitat ==
The serotine bat utilises in a wide variety of habitats including temperate and subtropical dry forest, maquis, agricultural land, semi-desert and suburban areas.

== Biology ==
In Europe serotine bats start to establish maternity colonies consisting almost exclusively of females from late May. Colonies usually remain at a single roost site during the breeding season, although occasionally the larger colonies will change roost sites. The female bats usually give birth to a single pup in early July, though births have been recorded as late as mid-August.

The female bats normally give birth to a single young in late summer, and the baby is occasionally carried by its mother for the first few days. The young bats usually make their first flights at around three weeks old, and at six weeks they can forage for themselves. Breeding colonies usually disperse by early September, although a few bats may use the colony site as a roost until early October. The male bats probably remain solitary or in small groups but are occasionally found with females in spring or autumn. Mating seems to take place in the autumn, but very little is known about the mating behaviour. Both sexes reach sexual maturity at one year old.

Serotine bats mainly use buildings for summer roosts, especially those older buildings with high gables and cavity walls, and often occur in churches; modern buildings are used infrequently. The roost is normally accessed at or near the gable apex or the lower eaves. The serotine bat is hardly ever found in trees, which were the most likely pre-human roost sites, and the species seems to be very oriented towards using buildings. The roost is sometimes shared with pipistrelles or brown long-eared bats, and this species has also been recorded associating with Natterer's bats, whiskered bats and noctule bats. Only a few serotine bats have been found in winter, but it seems likely that most hibernate in buildings in cavity walls and disused chimneys. There are a few records of them being found in the coldest parts of caves, either in roof crevices or in accumulations of boulders.

The foraging activity of serotine bats peaks at dusk, and there is a second period of activity around dawn. They commute on average 6.5 km (4.0 mi) to and from feeding areas per night, and forage in up to five distinct areas per night. This species uses three main feeding strategies: short flights, ground feeding and aerial hawking. It normally forages quite low, 0–5 m (0–16 ft) above the ground.

== Diet ==
The serotine bat is an aerial hawker and hunts mainly flying insects like butterflies and moths.

== Reproduction ==
In 2023 it was reported that Serotine bat is the first known instance of non-penetrative reproductive sex in mammals, a reason seems to be that the male has a rather large penis which spans about a 22% of his entire body length making penetration difficult so the penis is just held firmly against the vulva. Their form of copulation is unique among mammals, but is more analogous to the cloacal kissing found among birds.

== Echolocation ==
The frequencies used by this bat species for echolocation lie between 25–55 kHz, have most energy at 31 kHz and have an average duration of 8.8 ms.

== Conservation ==
The serotine bat has declined in many areas in its European range. Loss of feeding habitat is thought to have played a part in the decline. In addition, as this bat almost exclusively roosts in buildings, it is highly vulnerable to disturbance from construction work and toxic timber treatments. In the United Kingdom serotine bats benefit from a very comprehensive level of legal protection, as is the case across much of Europe.

== Predation ==
Serotine bats are opportunistically preyed on by other aves and some snakes if the opportunity presents itself. Some snakes such as the horseshoe whip snake (Hemorrhois hippocrepis) may prey on them when they are roosting in buildings. Western barn owls, tawny owls, and common kestrels are some of the birds that eat serotine bats as part of their diet.
