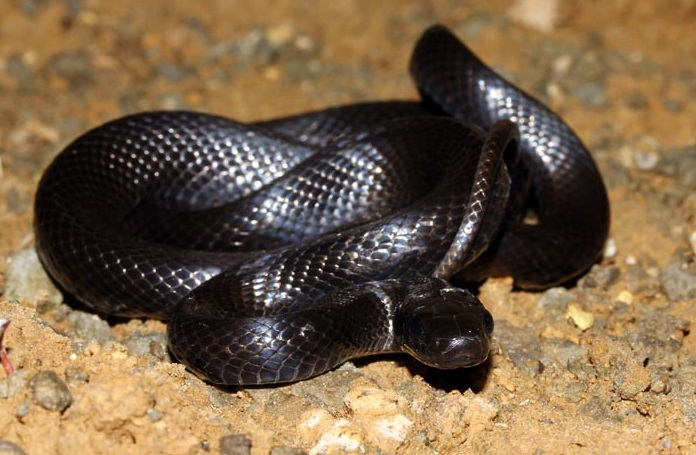

Conservation status
- Data Deficient (IUCN 3.1)

Scientific classification
- Kingdom: Animalia
- Phylum: Chordata
- Class: Reptilia
- Order: Squamata
- Suborder: Serpentes
- Family: Colubridae
- Genus: Zamenis
- Species: Z. persicus

Binomial name
- Zamenis persicus (F. Werner, 1913)

Synonyms
- Coluber longissimus var. persica F. Werner, 1913; Elaphe longissima persica — Mertens & L. Müller, 1928; Elaphe persica — Nilson & Andrén, 1984; Zamenis persicus — Utiger et al., 2002

= Persian ratsnake =

Species of snake

The Persian ratsnake (Zamenis persicus) is a species of medium-sized nonvenomous snake in the subfamily Colubrinae of the family Colubridae. The species is native to Western Asia.

== Geographic distribution ==
Zamenis persicus is found in temperate northwestern Iran and Azerbaijan, in the area near the Caspian Sea.

== Habitat ==
The preferred natural habitats of Zamenis persicus are forest, shrubland, and rocky areas, at elevations from sea level to 1,700 m (5,600 ft).

== Description ==
Adults of Zamenis persicus are from 70–90 cm (28–35 in) up to 120 cm (47 in) in total length (tail included), and usually jet black or grey with white markings along the lateral portion of the forebody. Males seem to grow larger than females.

== Taxonomy ==
Zamenis persicus has habits very similar to Z. situla, and for many years it was considered a subspecies of Elaphe longissima. It was granted full species status in 1984 (Nilson and Andrén).

== Behavior ==
The Persian ratsnake is principally regarded as a terrestrial species, spending most of its time in the leaf litter; however, it is also an agile climber and will mount low brush.

== Diet ==
The diet of Zamenis persicus, like that of most colubrids, consists primarily of small mammals, but it may also eat other small reptiles and amphibians.

== Reproduction ==
Sexually mature female Persian ratsnakes lay clutches of 4–9 eggs, which hatch after 45–55 days.

== In captivity ==
For Zamenis persicus, a hibernation period of 2–3 months is recommended.
