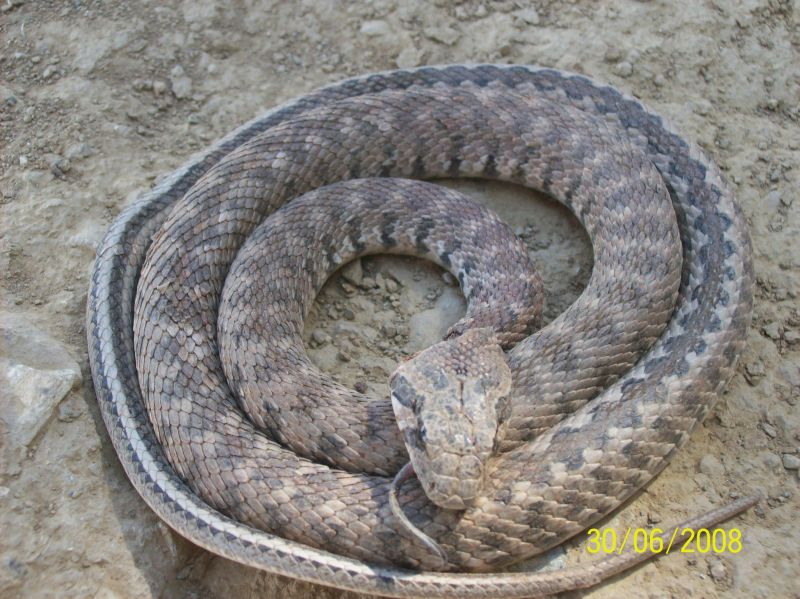

Conservation status
- Least Concern (IUCN 3.1)

Scientific classification
- Kingdom: Animalia
- Phylum: Chordata
- Class: Reptilia
- Order: Squamata
- Suborder: Serpentes
- Family: Colubridae
- Genus: Hemorrhois
- Species: H. ravergieri

Binomial name
- Hemorrhois ravergieri (Ménétries, 1832)

Synonyms
- Coluber ravergieri Ménétries, 1832; Zamenis caudælineatus Günther, 1858; Periops caudælineatus — Jan, 1865; Zamenis fedtschenkoi Strauch, 1873; Zamenis ravergieri — Boulenger, 1893; Elaphe caudaelineata — Schmidt, 1939; Hemorrhois ravergieri — Nagy et al., 2004

= Hemorrhois ravergieri =

Species of snake

Hemorrhois ravergieri, commonly called the spotted whip snake, is a species of aglyphous (non-venomous) ophidian snake in the family Colubridae. It is endemic to Western, Central and South-Central Asia, from Turkey in the west to Kazakhstan and western Mongolia in the east.

== Etymology ==
The specific name, ravergieri, is in honor of a certain Mr. Ravergier who was an attaché at the French embassy in Saint Petersburg, Russia.

== Geographic range ==
H. ravergieri is found in the following localities.

- Greece: Kos
- Middle East: Turkey, Iraq, Iran, Lebanon, Syria, Jordan, Israel

The former Soviet republics of the Caucasus and Central Asia, the latter from the eastern shore of the Caspian Sea east to E Kazakhstan:

- Caucasus: parts of Russia, Armenia, Georgia, Azerbaijan
- Central Asia: Kazakhstan, Turkmenistan, Uzbekistan, Tajikistan
- South Asia: Afghanistan, Pakistan
- East Asia: W Mongolia, NW China (Xinjiang)

== Description ==
Dorsally, H. ravergieri is tan or grayish, with a series of dark rhomboidal spots or crossbars, alternating with smaller spots on the sides. The spots usually become confluent posteriorly, and appear as dark stripes on the tail. There is a diagonal dark streak below the eye, and a similar subparallel streak from the back of the eye to the corner of the mouth. Ventrally, it is whitish or covered with blackish dots.

The weakly keeled dorsal scales are arranged in 21 rows. The ventrals, which are obtusely angulate laterally, number 190-222; the anal is divided; and the subcaudals, which are paired, are 75–101.

Adults may attain 133 cm (4 ft 4 in) in total length, with a tail 32 cm (12 1/2 in) long.

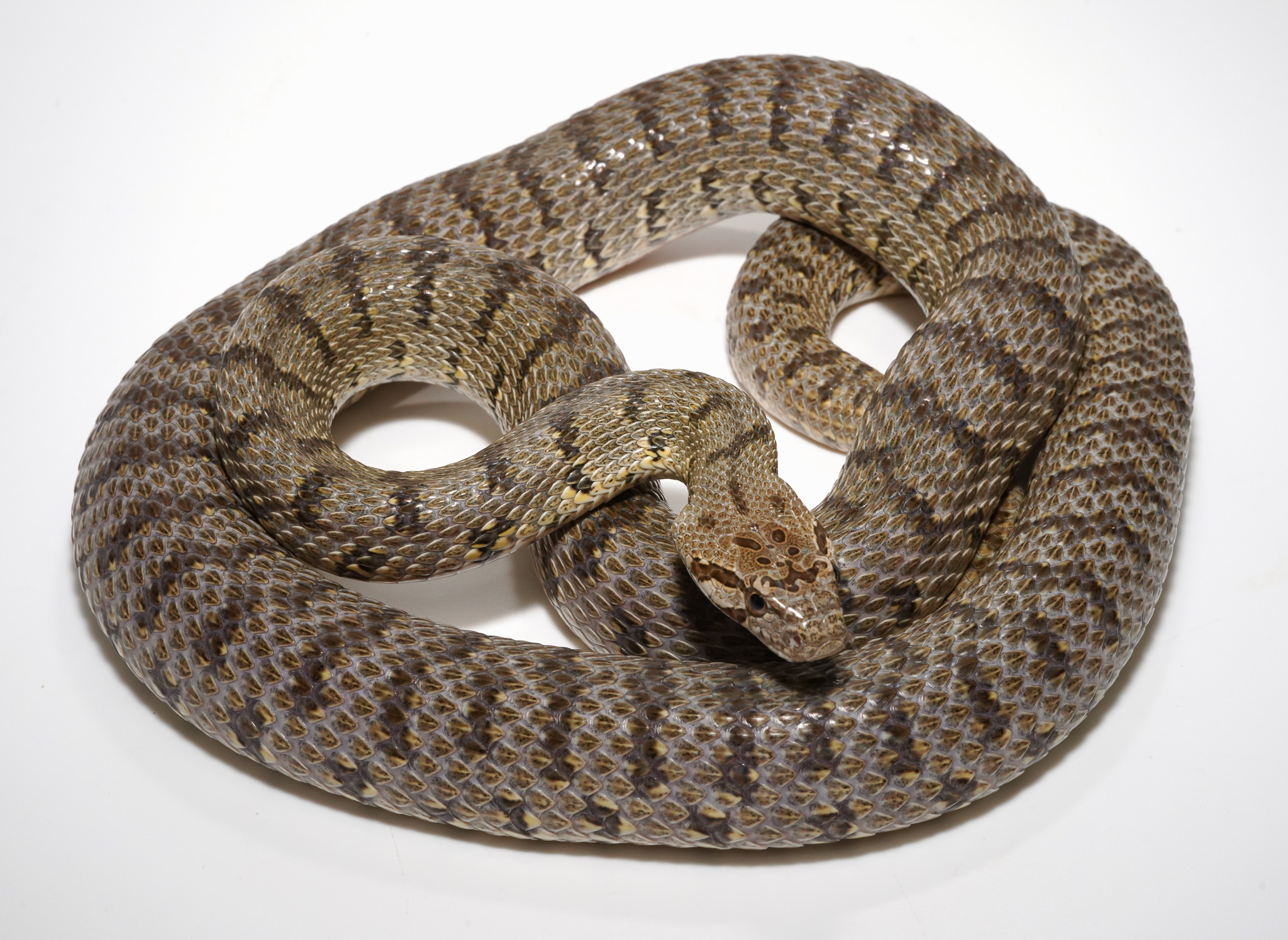
H. ravergieri from a line that originates from Uzbekistan.

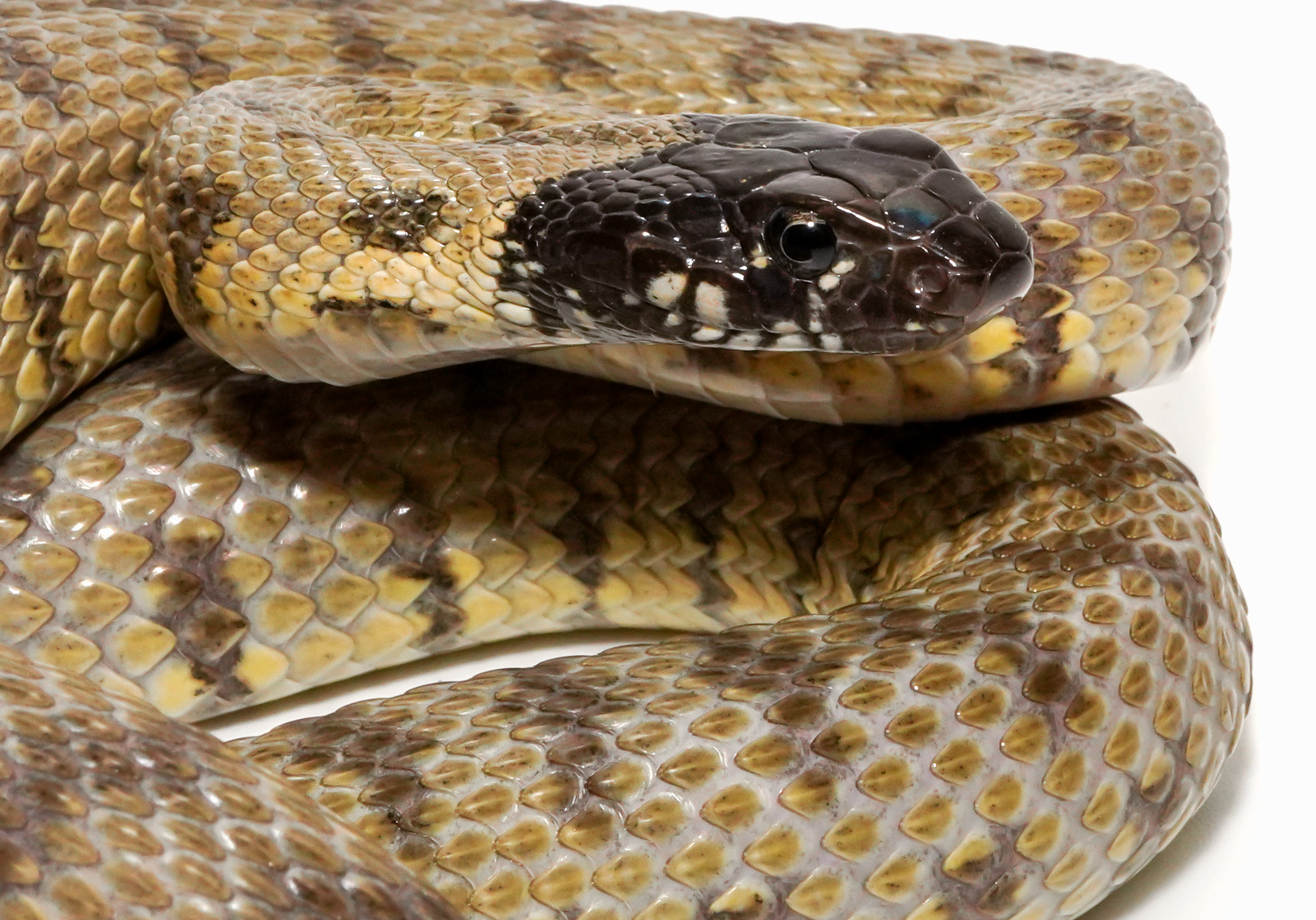
A naturally occurring "black-headed" trait in H. ravergieri from a line that originates from Uzbekistan.
