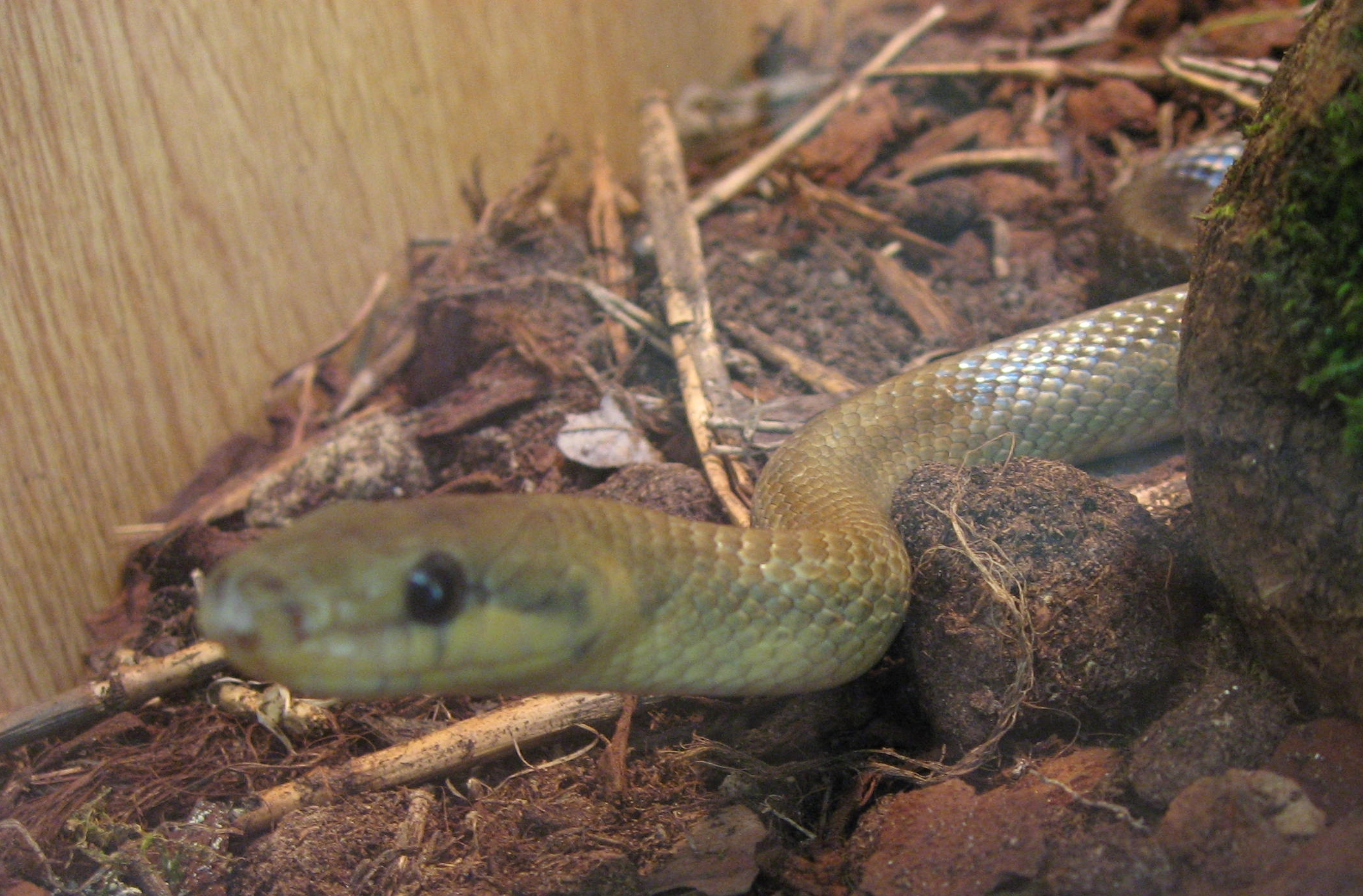
- Z. longissimus

Scientific classification
- Kingdom: Animalia
- Phylum: Chordata
- Class: Reptilia
- Order: Squamata
- Suborder: Serpentes
- Family: Colubridae
- Subfamily: Colubrinae
- Genus: Zamenis; Wagler, 1830

= Zamenis =

Genus of snakes

Zamenis is a genus of Old World non-venomous snakes in the subfamily Colubrinae of the family Colubridae. Species of the genus Zamenis are native to Europe and the Middle East.

== Etymology ==
The generic name Zamenis comes from Greek ζαμενής (lat. vehemens, iracundus) meaning "angry", "irritable", "fierce".

== Species ==
The following six species are recognized as being valid:

- Zamenis hohenackeri (Strauch, 1873) – Transcaucasian ratsnake
- Zamenis lineatus (Camerano, 1891) – Italian Aesculapian snake
- Zamenis longissimus (Laurenti, 1768) – Aesculapian snake
- Zamenis persicus (F. Werner, 1913) – Persian ratsnake
- Zamenis scalaris (Schinz, 1822) – ladder snake
- Zamenis situla (Linnaeus, 1758) – European ratsnake

Nota bene: A binomial authority in parentheses indicates that the species was originally described in a genus other than Zamenis.
