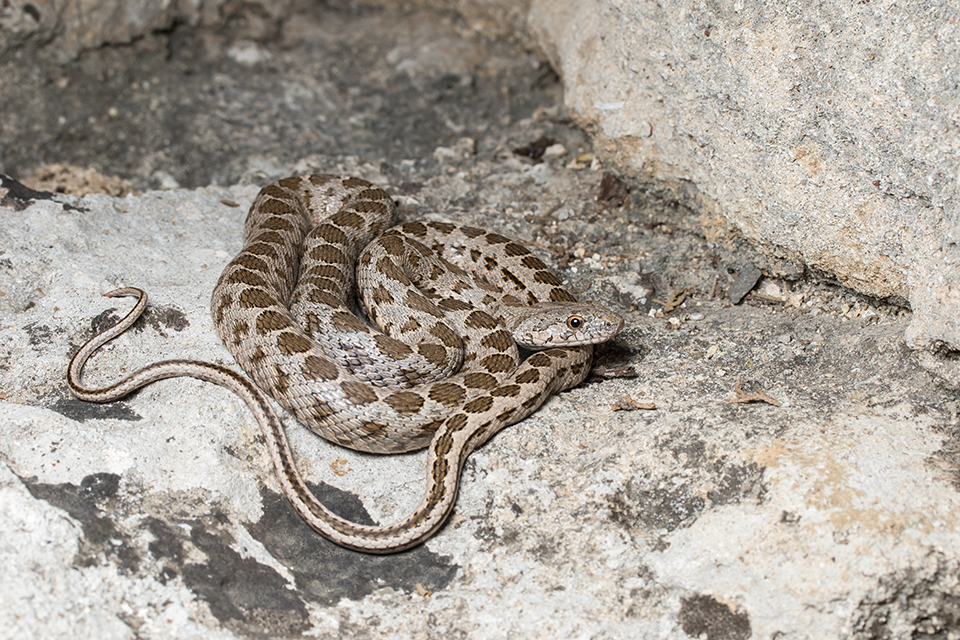

Conservation status
- Least Concern (IUCN 3.1)

Scientific classification
- Kingdom: Animalia
- Phylum: Chordata
- Class: Reptilia
- Order: Squamata
- Suborder: Serpentes
- Family: Colubridae
- Genus: Hemorrhois
- Species: H. nummifer

Binomial name
- Hemorrhois nummifer (Reuss, 1834)

Synonyms
- Coluber tyria Linnaeus, 1758; Coluber nummifer Reuss, 1834

= Hemorrhois nummifer =

Coin-marked snake

Species of snake

Hemorrhois nummifer, also known as the coin-marked snake, Asian racer, and leaden-colored racer, is a species of snake belonging to the family Colubridae. It is found in southeastern Europe, Western and Central Asia, and northeast Africa.

== Geographic range ==
Hemorrhois nummifer is found widely in Western and Central Asia (Turkey southward to Syria, Lebanon, northern and central Israel, Palestine, western and northwestern Jordan, and eastward to Armenia, northern Iraq, northeastern Iran, Turkmenistan, southern Uzbekistan, Tajikistan, and Kyrgyzstan) and also occurs in extreme southeastern Europe (Greece: the Aegean islands, including Kalymnos, Kos, and Lipsi; Cyprus). Isolated populations exist in northern Egypt (near Cairo and in the southern Sinai Peninsula).

== Description ==
Hemorrhois nummifer can grow to 100 cm (39 in) in total length but is often smaller. The body is strong and fairly robustly built. It is brown, grey, or olive grey above and often has a dorsal row of about 57–65 large spots, turning into a continuous line on the tail. Smaller spots complement the larger spots on the sides. The belly is grey white.

== Habitat ==
Hemorrhois nummifer occurs in open areas, including open dry woodland and shrubland, with some rocks and bushy vegetation. It is an adaptable species that inhabits both rural and urban areas. It is typically a lowland species but can be found at elevations up to 2,000 m (6,600 ft) in Turkey.

== Behaviour and ecology ==
This snake is a diurnal, actively foraging predator with a diet consisting mainly of small mammals, lizards, and small birds. It is harmless to humans but appears to mimic vipers both in appearance and behaviourally (i.e., Batesian mimicry).

H. nummifer in Jerusalem
