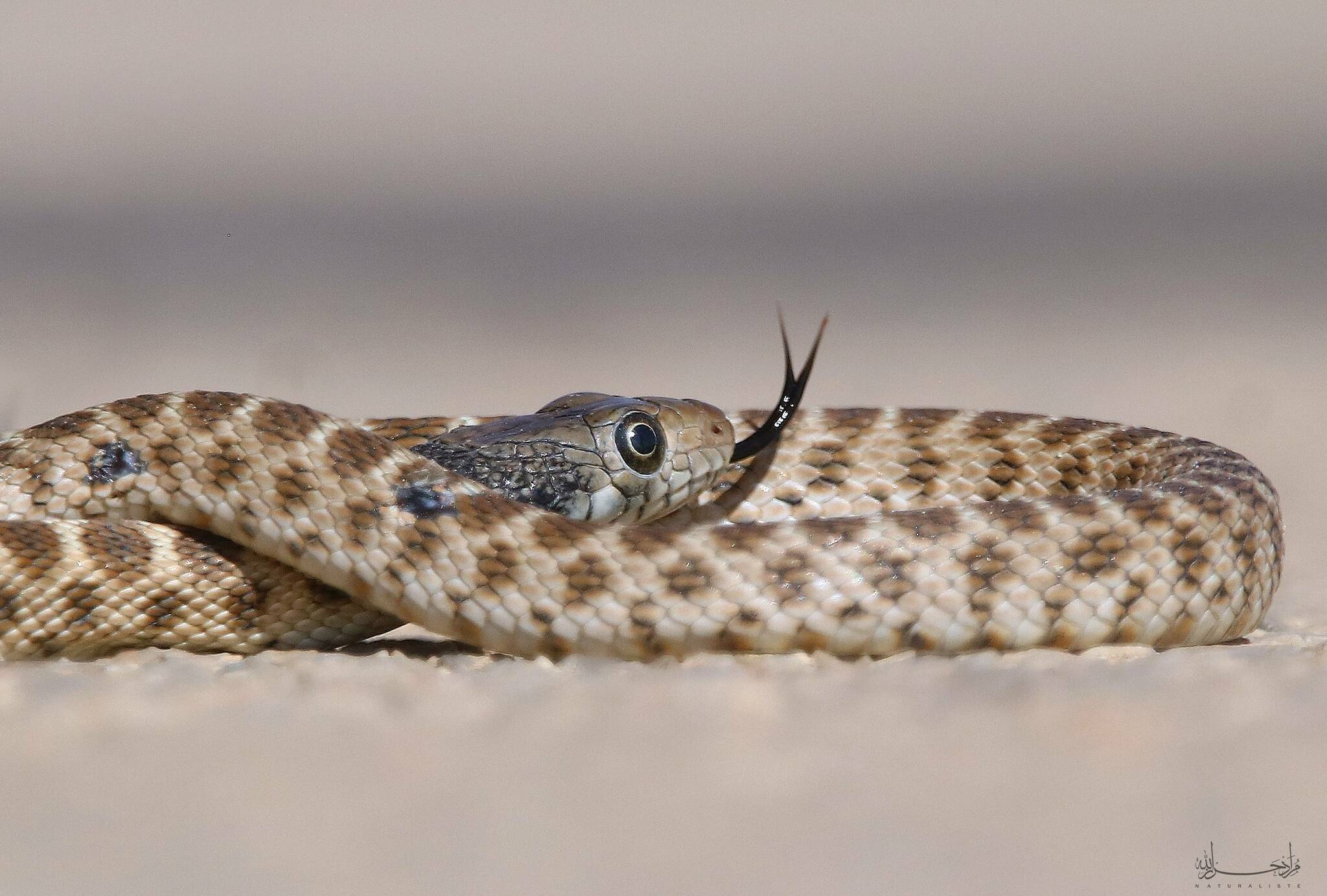

Conservation status
- Least Concern (IUCN 3.1)

Scientific classification
- Kingdom: Animalia
- Phylum: Chordata
- Class: Reptilia
- Order: Squamata
- Suborder: Serpentes
- Family: Colubridae
- Genus: Hemorrhois
- Species: H. algirus

Binomial name
- Hemorrhois algirus (Jan, 1863)

= Hemorrhois algirus =

Species of snake

Hemorrhois algirus, the Algerian whip snake, is a species of non-venomous snake in the family Colubridae. The species is found in Morocco, Algeria, Tunisia, Libya, Mauritania, Western Sahara, and Egypt.
