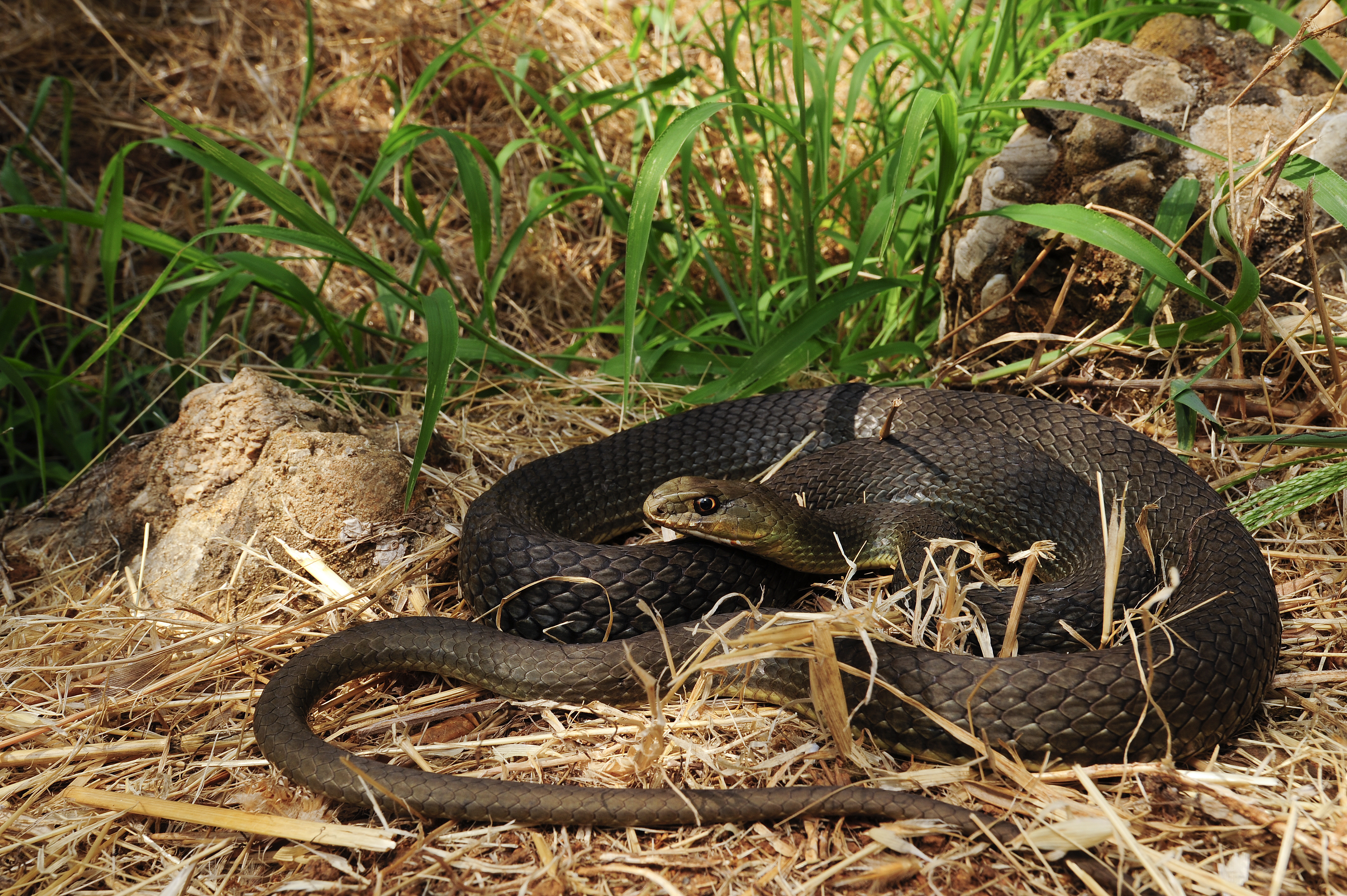

Conservation status
- Least Concern (IUCN 3.1)

Scientific classification
- Kingdom: Animalia
- Phylum: Chordata
- Class: Reptilia
- Order: Squamata
- Suborder: Serpentes
- Family: Psammophiidae
- Genus: Malpolon
- Species: M. insignitus

Binomial name
- Malpolon insignitus (St.-Hilaire, 1827)

Synonyms
- Coluber insignitus; Coelopeltis insignitus; Malpolon monspessulana insignitus; Malpolon monspessulanus insignitus

= Eastern Montpellier snake =

Species of snake

The eastern Montpellier snake (Malpolon insignitus) is a species of mildly venomous rear-fanged snake.

== Geographic range ==
M. insignitus ranges from the eastern Adriatic coast in Italy, Slovenia, Croatia, Bosnia and Herzegovina, Montenegro and Albania, the southern Balkans in Bulgaria, North Macedonia and Greece, western Asia and Caucasus in Turkey, Cyprus, Syria, Israel, Jordan, Russia, Georgia, Armenia, Azerbaijan, Iraq and Iran, and along northern Africa in Egypt, Libya, Tunisia and Algeria.

== Description ==
It usually has 19 dorsal scale rows on its mid-body, but males lack a dark 'saddle'. It often has narrow, pale longitudinal stripes.

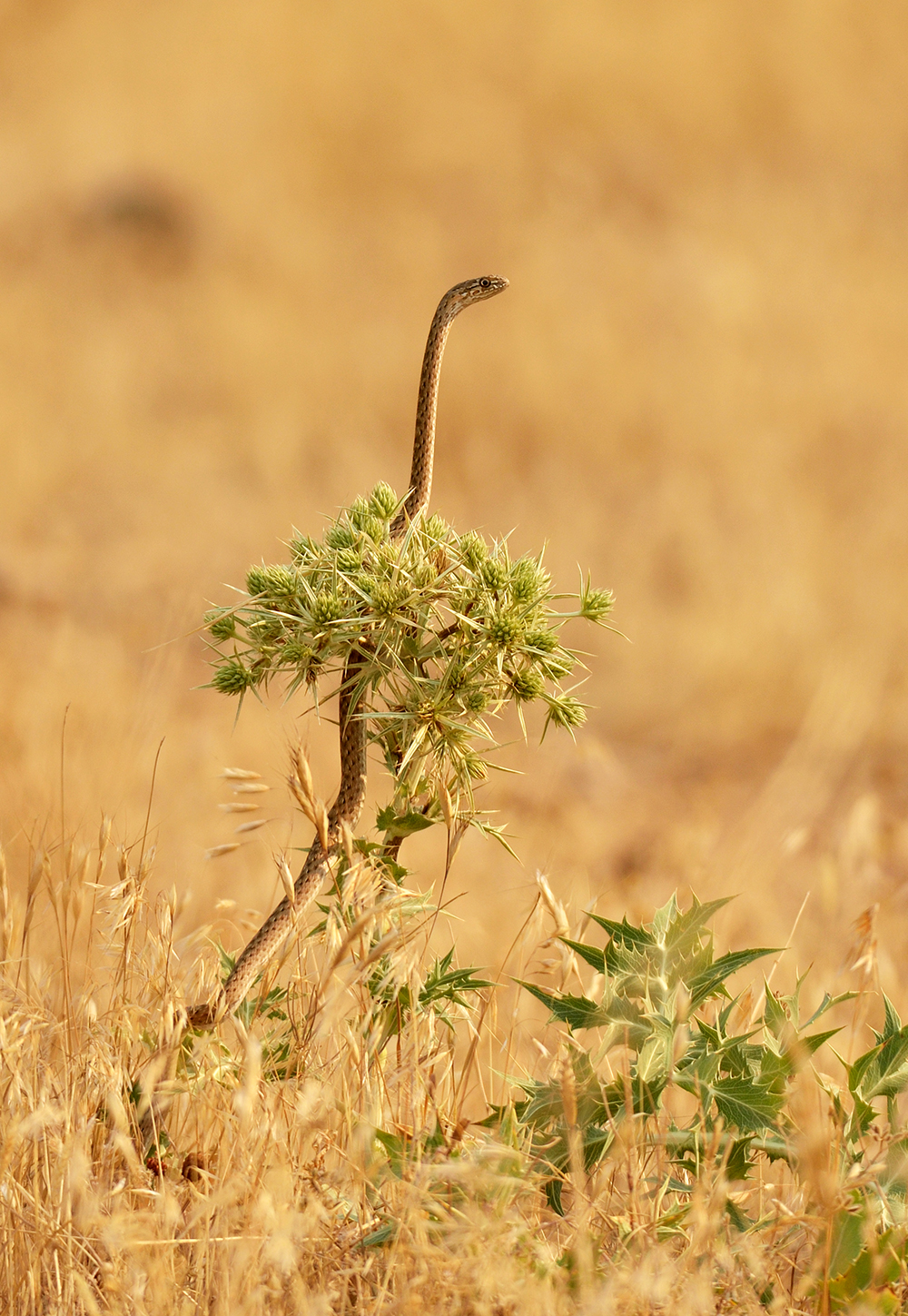

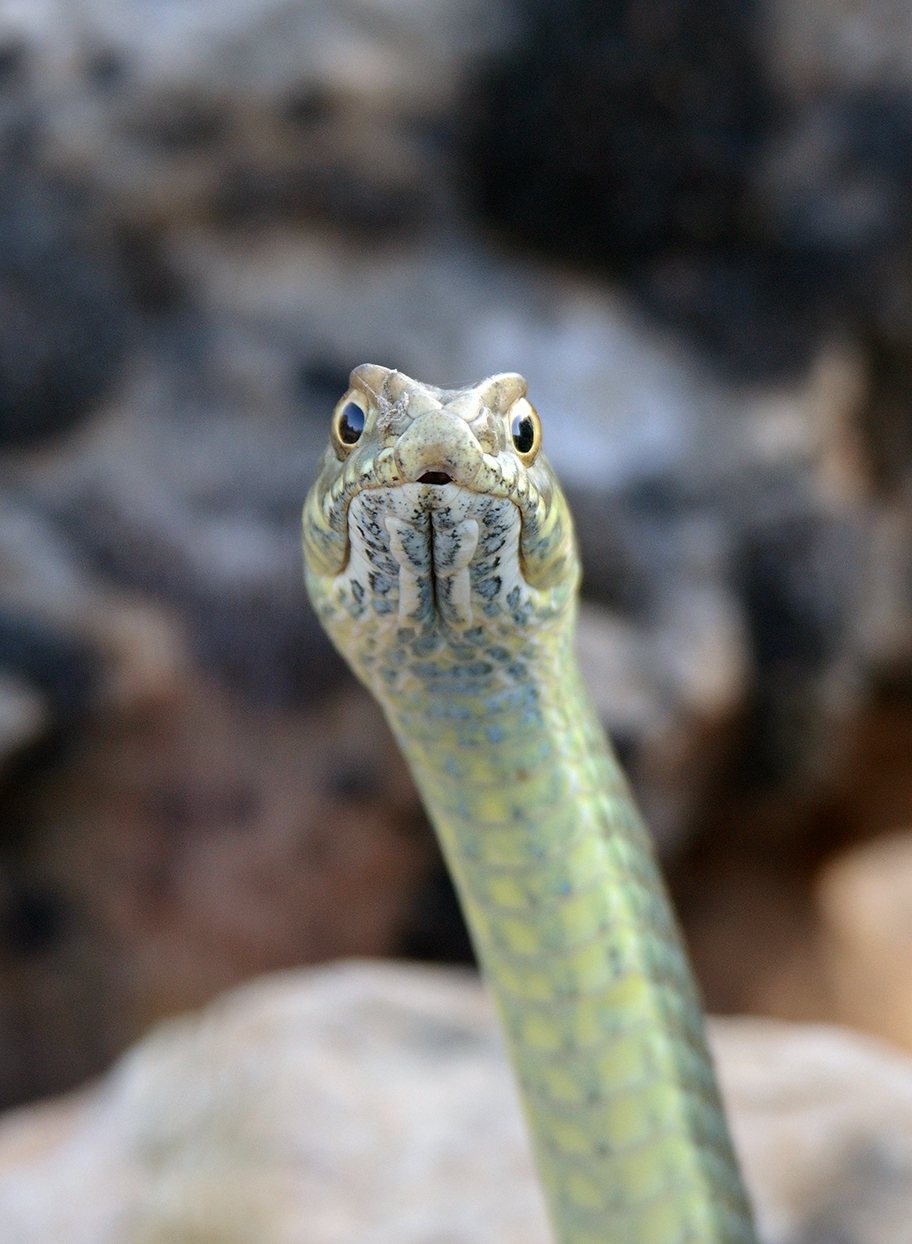

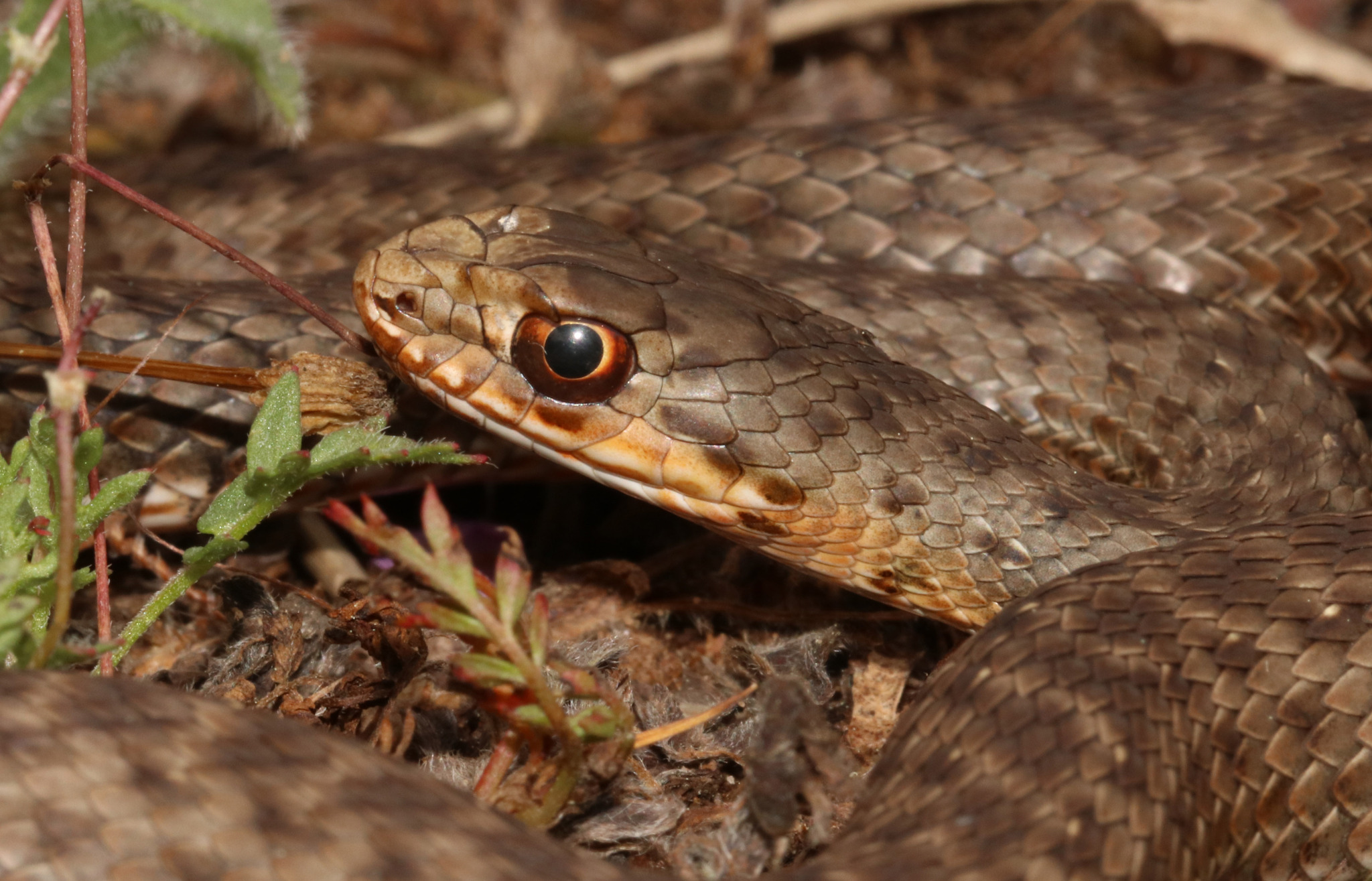
In Greece

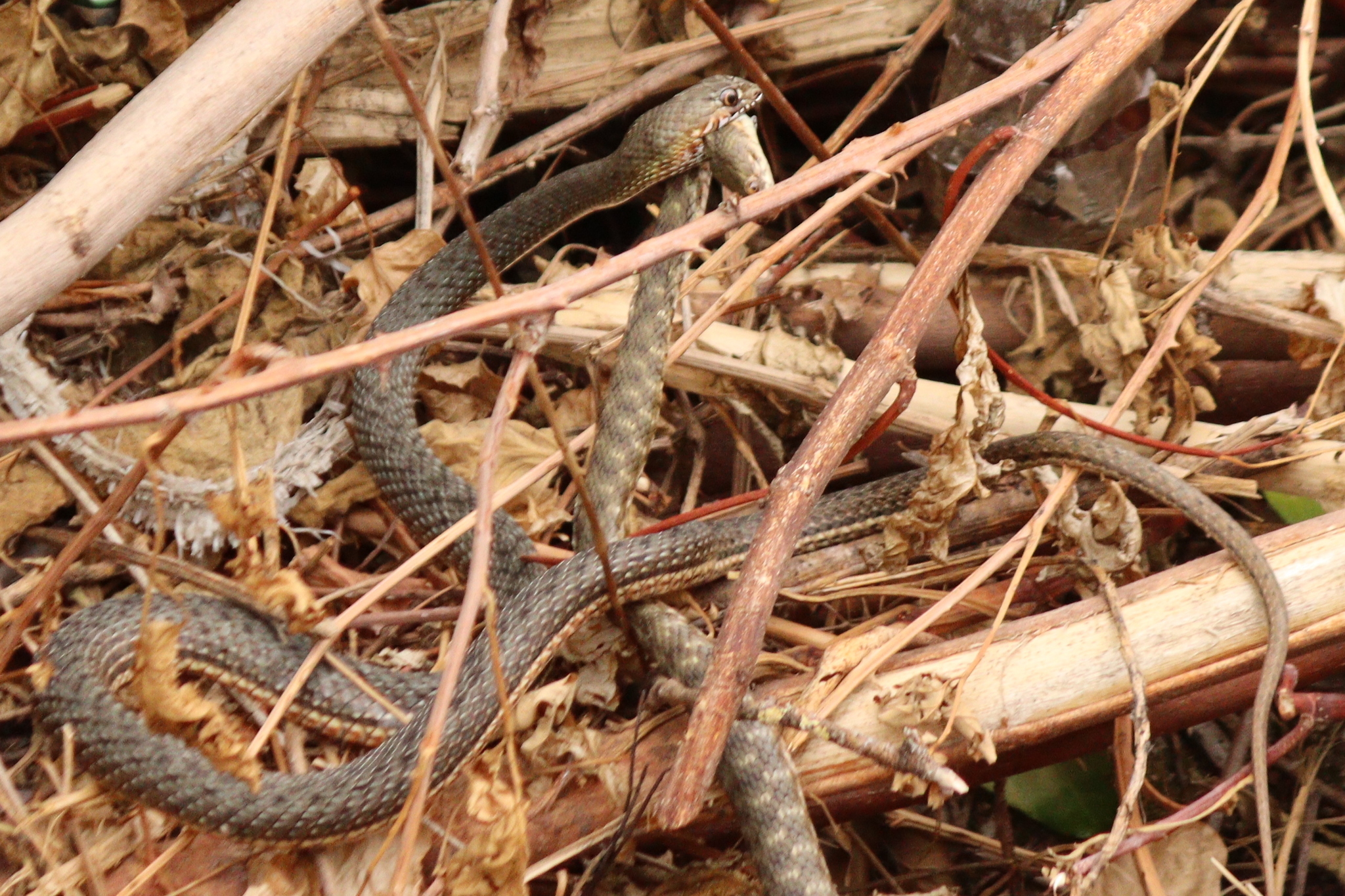
Eating a tessellated water snake
