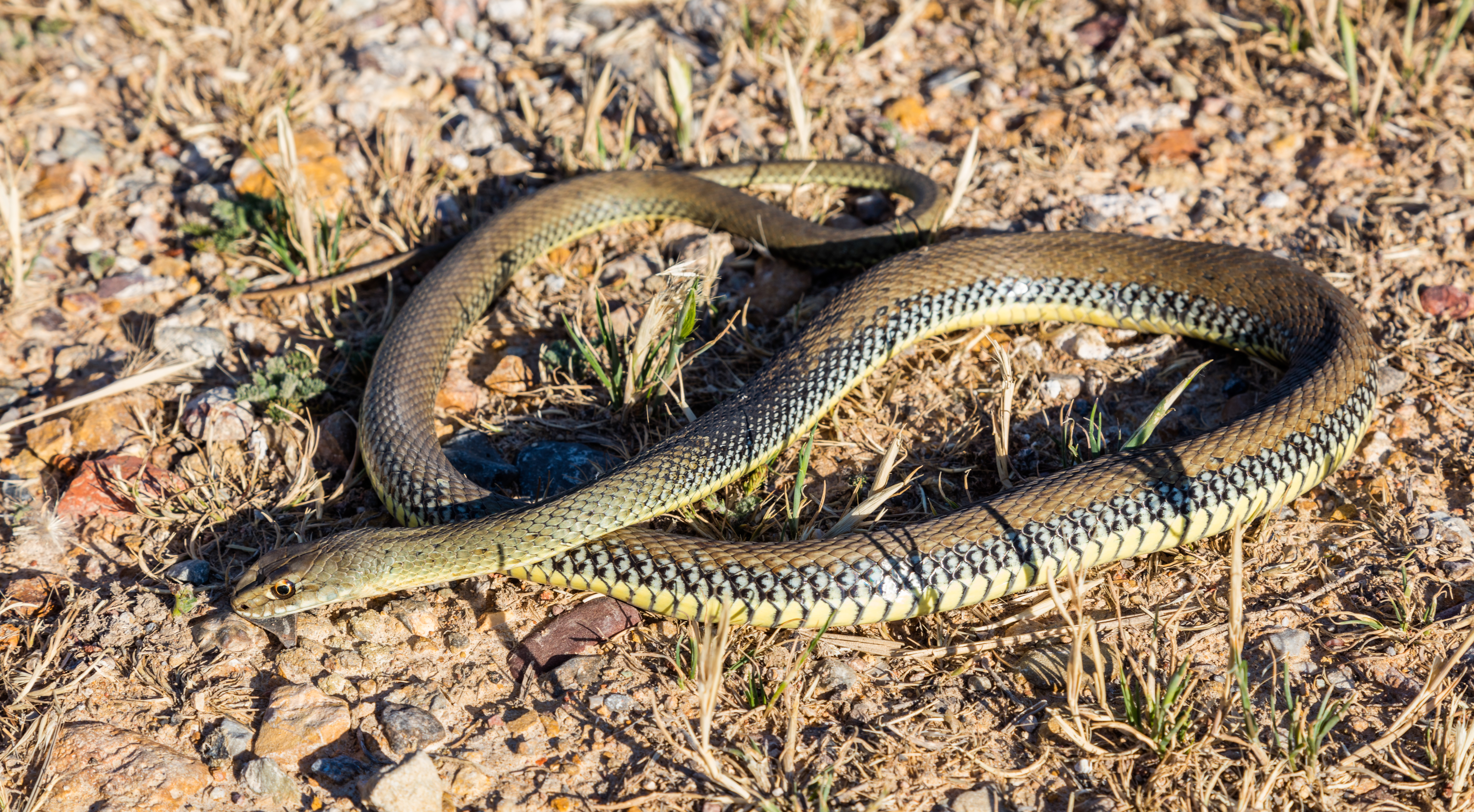

Conservation status
- Least Concern (IUCN 3.1)

Scientific classification
- Kingdom: Animalia
- Phylum: Chordata
- Class: Reptilia
- Order: Squamata
- Suborder: Serpentes
- Family: Psammophiidae
- Genus: Malpolon
- Species: M. monspessulanus

Binomial name
- Malpolon monspessulanus (Hermann, 1804)

Synonyms
- Coluber monspessulanus Hermann, 1804; Cœlopeltis monspessulana — Ranzani, 1836; Malpolon monspessulanus — Mertens & L. Müller, 1928

= Malpolon monspessulanus =

Species of snake

Malpolon monspessulanus, commonly known as the Montpellier snake, is a species of mildly venomous rear-fanged snake.

== Geographic range ==
It is very common in Spain, Portugal and Northwest Africa, being also present in the southern Mediterranean coast of France and the western regions of the Middle East. The snake's specific name, monspessulanus, is a Latinized form of Montpellier, a city in southern France.

== Description ==
It is up to 2.55 metres (8 ft) long and may weigh up to 2 kilograms (4 lb).

== Behavior and diet ==
It is active during the day and mainly feeds on lizards.

== Venom ==
Although it is venomous, only a few cases of envenomation of humans are known, one of which occurred when a finger was inserted into the snake's mouth. The Montpellier snake is not a dangerous snake for humans. The rear fangs reduce the possibility of venom injection, and the venom is of low toxicity. Venom injections are possible in bites of big individuals. The venom is not very dangerous; symptomatic treatment suffices to treat an envenomation. The unthreatening nature of the snake, along with its relatively mild persecution by man, has made it one of the most common species throughout its range, even in areas occupied by humans.

== Evolution ==
Genetic evidence suggests that the species originated in the Maghreb, migrating into southwestern Europe between 83,000 and 168,000 years ago and into southeastern Europe and western Asia at an earlier time. It is most closely related to the North African and Arabian species Malpolon moilensis and to a fossil species from the Pliocene of Spain, Malpolon mlynarskii, with which it forms the genus Malpolon. Malpolon has a good fossil record, dating back to the Pliocene in both southwestern Europe and northern Africa, but many of the fossils are isolated vertebrae, which are difficult to assign to species.

== Subspecies ==
There are three major subspecies of M. monspessulanus throughout its Mediterranean range. There is a deep genetic divergence between the western subspecies, M. m. monspessulanus, and the two eastern subspecies, M. m. insignitus and M. m. fuscus, leading to a proposal to recognize the eastern form as a distinct species, M. insignitus. These two groups are estimated to have split about 3.5 to 6 million years ago. A fourth subspecies, M. m. saharatlanticus, was described in 2006.

=== M. m. monspessulanus ===
M. m. monspessulanus occurs in southwestern Europe (Spain, Portugal, southern France and northwestern Italy) and the western Maghreb, where it is found in Morocco and coastal Algeria, east to Algiers. On the mid-body, there are usually 19 dorsal scale rows and a dark 'saddle' on the foreparts is present in males. M. m. monspessulanus possesses a single median process on its basioccipital bone that forms a strong spur, directed backwards; in the two eastern subspecies, two processes or indistinct hardened pieces of bones are present. There is little genetic or morphological differentiation between North African and European populations, suggesting a recent arrival in Europe.

=== M. m. fuscus ===
M. m. fuscus is found in southeastern Europe and Turkey through northern Iraq and western Iran. It differs from M. m. insignitus in having only 17 dorsal scale rows on its mid-body.

=== M. m. saharatlanticus ===
Another subspecies, M. m. saharatlanticus, lives in the region from Bouizakarne in Morocco to Dakhla in the Western Sahara, inland to Aoulouz and Tafraoute.

=== Delimitation issues ===
Forms of M. monspessulanus found in the more arid parts of Syria, Jordan, and Iraq are sometimes hard to classify because they have either 17 or 19 scale rows, resembling both M. m. fuscus and M. m. insignitus.

== Human interaction ==
The animal is not threatened by its interactions with humans and is assessed as "Least Concern", but it is often killed by cars and farmers, and is sometimes used by snake charmers and sold as curio. Even in areas affected by humans, the population is stable and in some areas growing. It is found in a number of protected areas.
