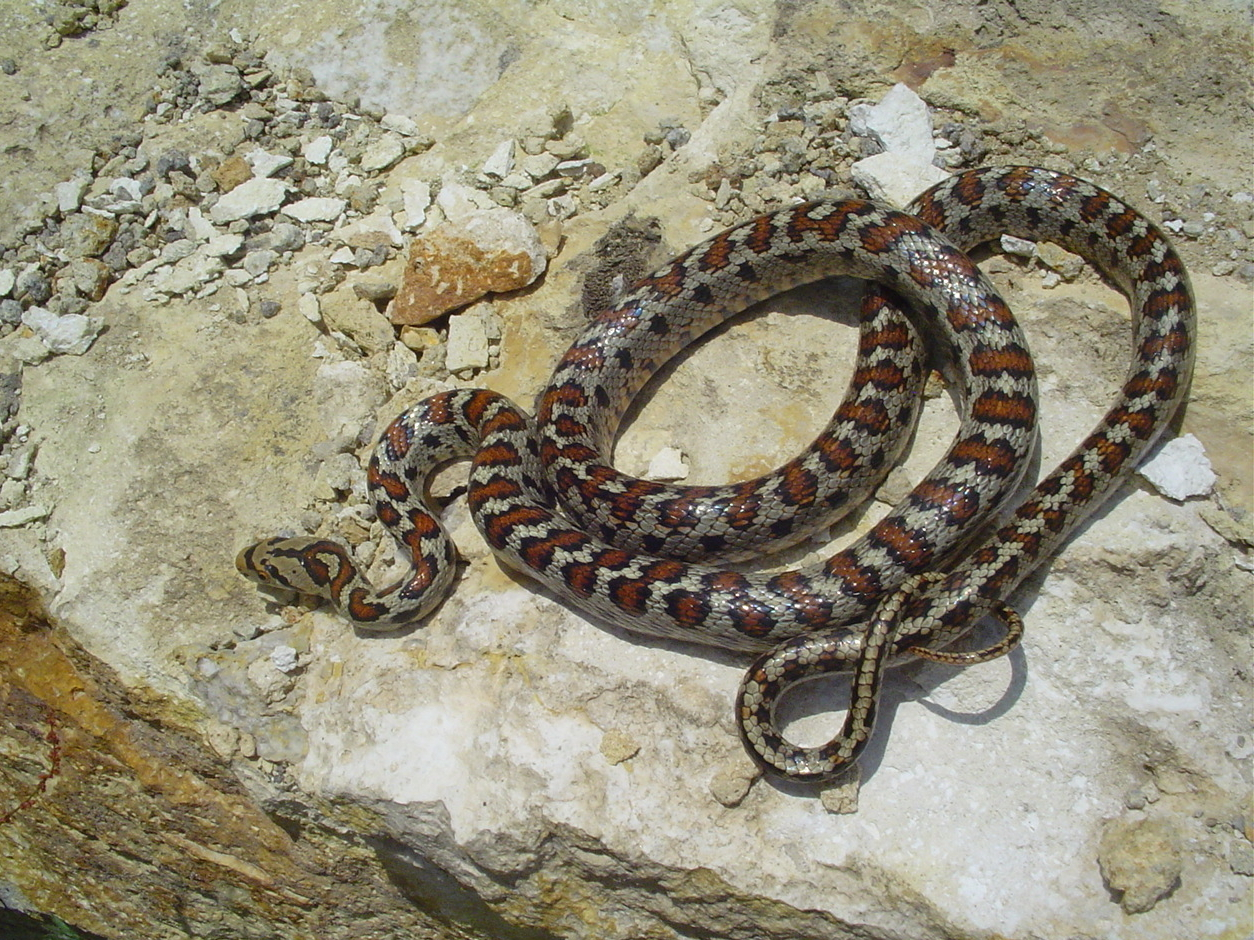
- Zamenis situla

Conservation status
- Least Concern (IUCN 3.1)

Scientific classification
- Kingdom: Animalia
- Phylum: Chordata
- Class: Reptilia
- Order: Squamata
- Suborder: Serpentes
- Family: Colubridae
- Genus: Zamenis
- Species: Z. situla

Binomial name
- Zamenis situla (Linnaeus, 1758)

Synonyms
- Coluber situla Linnaeus, 1758; Coluber leopardinus Bonaparte, 1834; Callopeltis leopardinus (Bonaparte, 1834); Natrix leopardina (Bonaparte, 1834); Ablabes quadrilineata Duméril & Bibron, 1854; Coronella quadrilineata (Duméril & Bibron, 1854); Elaphe situla (Linnaeus, 1758)

= European ratsnake =

Species of snake

The European ratsnake (Zamenis situla), also known commonly as the leopard snake, is a species of nonvenomous snake belonging to the subfamily Colubrinae of the family Colubridae. This species is native to southeastern Europe and western Anatolia.

== Taxonomy ==
The European ratsnake was first formally described as "Coluber Situla" by Carl Linnaeus in the 10th edition of Systema Naturae published in 1758. Linnaeus gave the type locality as Egypt but this species does not occur there. This species is classified in the genus Zamenis which belongs to the subfamily Colubrinae of the family Colubridae.

== Geographic range ==
The European ratsnake is found in Albania, Bosnia and Herzegovina, Bulgaria, Croatia, Greece, Italy, North Macedonia, Malta, Montenegro, Turkey, Ukraine, and possibly Cyprus.

== Description ==
The European ratsnake is gray or tan with a dorsal series of reddish or brown transverse blotches, which have black borders. On each side is a series of smaller black spots, alternating with the dorsal blotches. There is a Y-shaped dark marking on the occiput and nape, a crescent-shaped black band from eye to eye across the prefrontals, and a black band from the postoculars diagonally to the corner of the mouth. The belly is white, checkered with black, or almost entirely back. The dorsal scales are in 25 or 27 rows, and are smooth. Adults may attain 90 cm (35 1/2 in) in total length, with a tail of 16 cm (6 1/4 in).

== Habitat ==
The European ratsnake is found in Mediterranean-type shrubby vegetation, pastureland, plantations, and rural gardens. It can be found up to 1,600 m (5,200 ft) above sea level. This species is attracted to anthropogenic habitats, including barns, gardens and even rubbish dumps, most likely attracted by rodents, so much that in Greek the leopard snake is known as the "house snake".

== Reproduction ==
Zamenis situla is oviparous. Clutch size is two to eight eggs.

== See also ==
- List of reptiles of Italy
