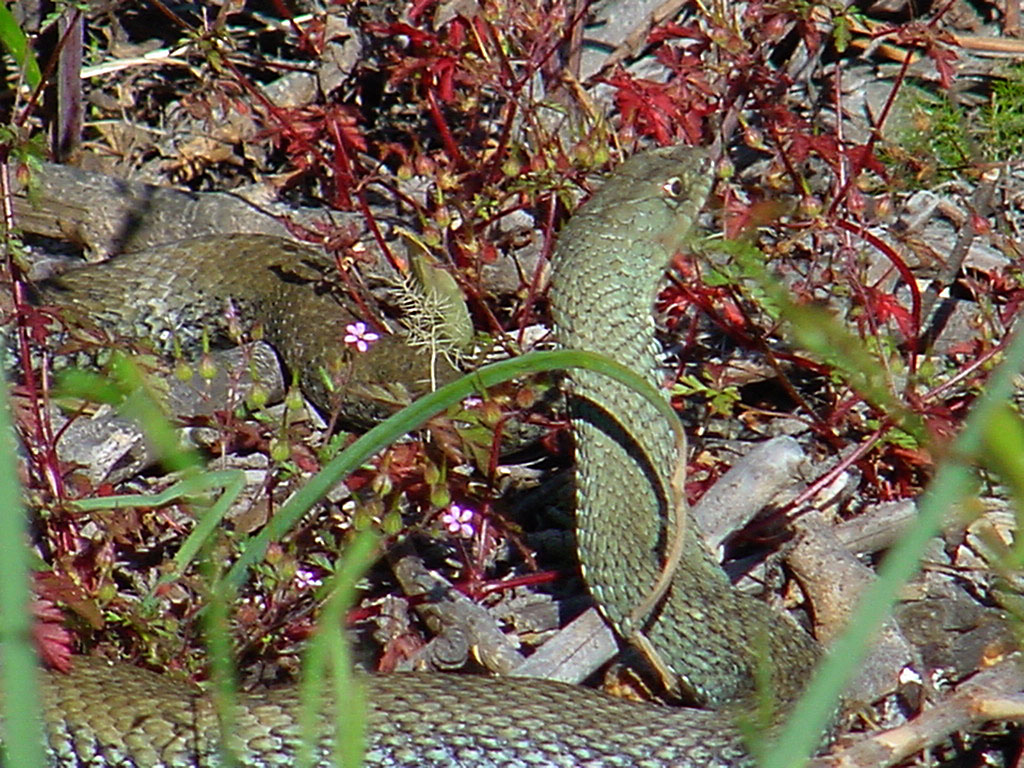
- Malpolon monspessulanus

Scientific classification
- Domain: Eukaryota
- Kingdom: Animalia
- Phylum: Chordata
- Class: Reptilia
- Order: Squamata
- Suborder: Serpentes
- Family: Psammophiidae
- Genus: Malpolon; Fitzinger, 1826

= Malpolon =

Genus of snakes

Malpolon is a genus of snakes, containing the following species:

- Malpolon insignitus (Geoffroy Saint-Hilaire, 1827) – eastern Montpellier snake
- Malpolon moilensis (Reuss, 1834) – False cobra
- Malpolon monspessulanus (Hermann, 1804) – Montpellier snake
