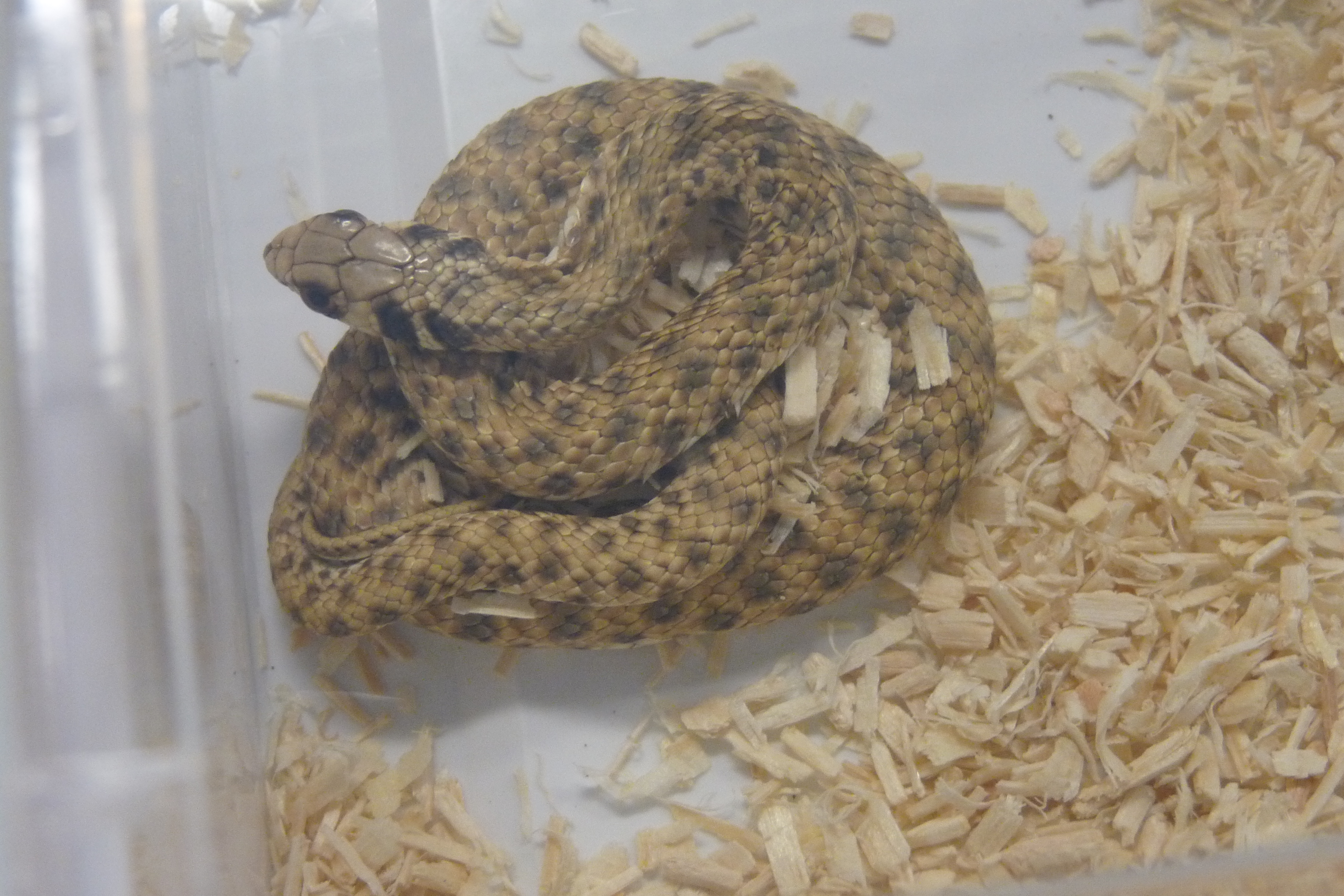
- In captivity

Conservation status
- Least Concern (IUCN 3.1)

Scientific classification
- Kingdom: Animalia
- Phylum: Chordata
- Class: Reptilia
- Order: Squamata
- Suborder: Serpentes
- Family: Psammophiidae
- Genus: Malpolon
- Species: M. moilensis

Binomial name
- Malpolon moilensis (Reuss, 1834)

Synonyms
- Coluber moilensis; Coelopeltis producta; Rhagerrhis moilensis; Rhagerhis moilensis; Rhagerrhis producta; Coelopeltis moilensis; Coelopeltis cordofanensis; Rhamphiophis septentrionalis; Malpolon moilensis; Rhamphiophis moilensis; Rhamphiophis maradiensis; Scutophis moilensis; Rhagerhis maradiensis

= False cobra =

Species of snake

The false cobra (Malpolon moilensis), or hooded malpolon, is an opisthoglyphous snake found in parts of Africa and the Middle East. The name "false cobra" comes from the fact that while it is not a cobra, it imitates a cobra's stance by spreading its neck into a hood and hissing like the cobra. It can grow up to 1.5 metres in length and preys on rodents and lizards, while it itself falls prey to the Great grey shrike.

== Description ==
Adults are usually 0.8 – 1.4 m in length, but some specimens have reached about 1.9 m. They have big round eyes, reddish in colour. One distinctive feature that the snake has is a black blotch which runs from the cheek to the angle of the jaw.

It generally has a straw coloured background checkered with brownish spots running along the body. The belly surface is usually creme.

== Geographical range ==
Malpolon moilensis is found in North Africa and the Middle East.

== Behavior ==
When threatened, Malpolon moilensis will imitate a cobra's stance by spreading its neck into a hood and hissing like the cobra.

== Feeding ==
In the wild, it mainly feeds on rodents, fledgling birds, and lizards. Captives accept mice (pre-killed, frozen, and live)

== Captivity ==
M. moilensis is not commonly found in collections in the United States, possibly due to the highly aggressive nature of some specimens. In the Middle East, they are rarely found in some petshops, as snakes are not commonly kept as pets. Some specimens can be extremely docile and easy to handle, while others might not tolerate handling and display their above-mentioned defensive posture. The venom may not be deadly, but if the fangs do get hold of bare flesh and venom is injected, the pain can be excruciating; causing swelling and potentially other complications.

== Care ==
In captivity, M. moilensis should be kept at low humidity, and can be fed a mouse (pinkies for smaller specimens) once every 14–20 days. They should be supplied with a clean bowl of water, a hiding place, and a small rock to assist in the shedding process.

== Shedding ==
M. moilensis will shed once every 30–50 days. Like other snakes, the process will take about 7–10 days. On the first two days, the eyes will become bluish in color and the skin will become pale. A week later, the snake will shed its skin. During the whole period, you should avoid handling the snake or feeding it.

== Postage stamps ==
In 2024 La poste du Mali issued a series of stamps with reptiles. False cobra appeared on one of them.
