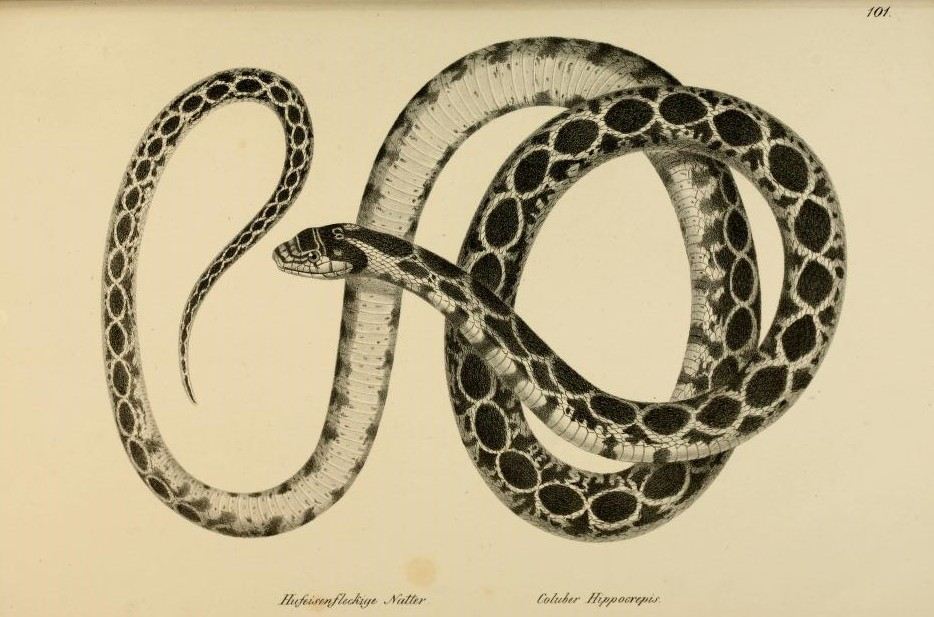
- Hemorrhois hippocrepis

Scientific classification
- Kingdom: Animalia
- Phylum: Chordata
- Class: Reptilia
- Order: Squamata
- Suborder: Serpentes
- Family: Colubridae
- Subfamily: Colubrinae
- Genus: Hemorrhois; H. Boie, 1826

Type species
- Hemorrhois hippocrepis (Linnaeus, 1758)

= Hemorrhois =

Genus of snakes

Hemorrhois is a squamate genus containing four species of aglyphous (non-venomous) ophidian colubrid snakes, commonly referred to as whip-snakes and Asian racers, respectively. Snakes of this genus are found in an array of habitats, though they predominantly inhabit arid regions, with the most common three species of the four being found on the Iberian Peninsula and in Morocco and Northern Africa. The species H. nummifer, the Asian racer, is found in the far east of mainland Greece, Turkey and the Levant (as far south as Jordan), as well as across Armenia and into Northern Iran, ranging as far east as Kyrgyzstan.

Snakes of the genus Hemorrhois are also found on certain islands in the Atlantic and the Mediterranean, including the Azores and Madeira (Portugal), Cyprus, Formantera and Ibiza (Spain), Malta, Rhodes and Kalymnos (Greece), and Sardinia (Italy).

== Species ==
It contains the following four species:

- Hemorrhois algirus (Jan, 1863) - Algerian whip snake
- Hemorrhois hippocrepis (Linnaeus, 1758), horseshoe whip snake
- Hemorrhois nummifer (Reuss, 1834) - Asian racer, coin-marked snake
- Hemorrhois ravergieri (Ménétries, 1832) - spotted whip snake
