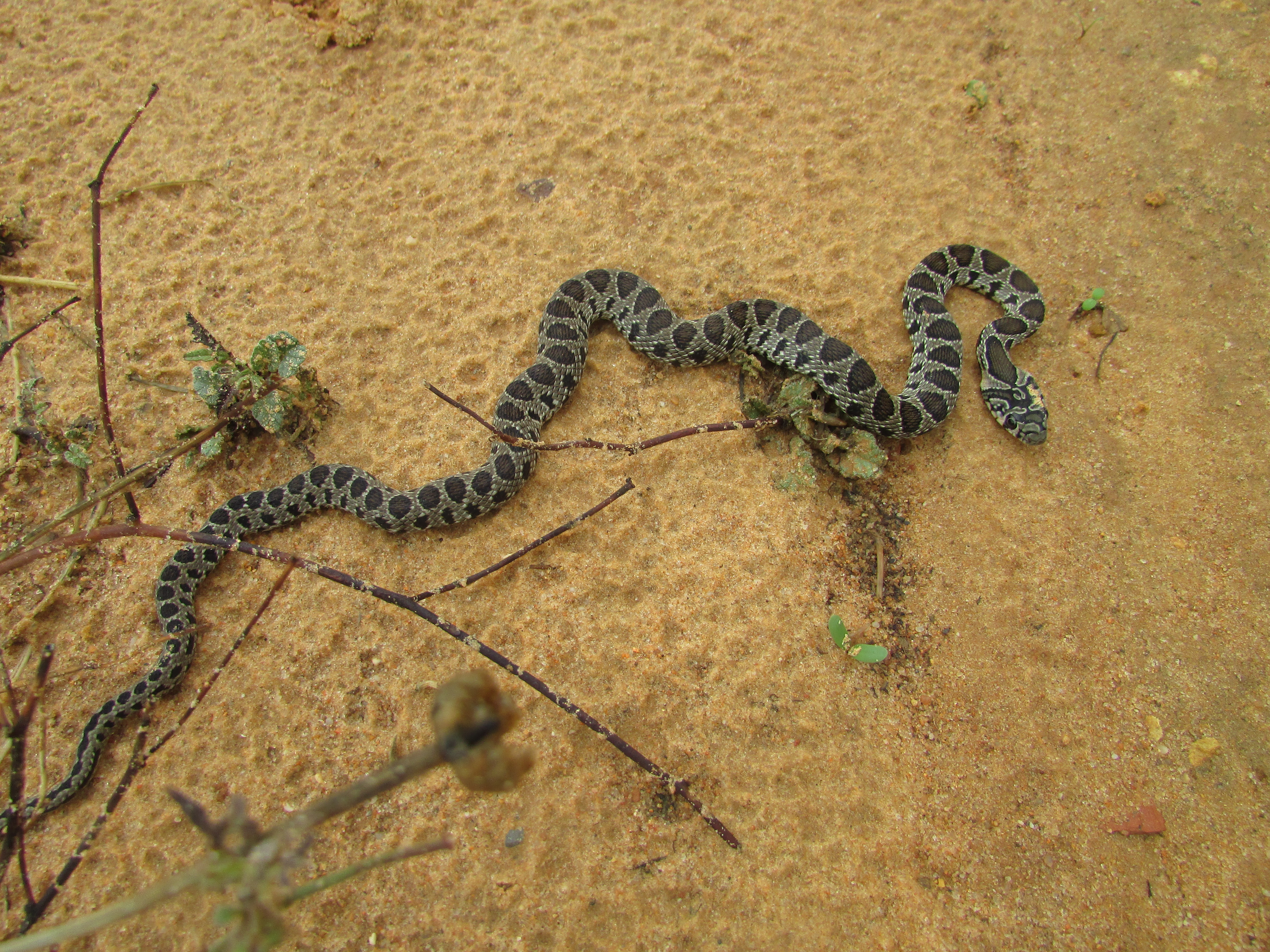

Conservation status
- Least Concern (IUCN 3.1)

Scientific classification
- Kingdom: Animalia
- Phylum: Chordata
- Class: Reptilia
- Order: Squamata
- Suborder: Serpentes
- Family: Colubridae
- Genus: Hemorrhois
- Species: H. hippocrepis

Binomial name
- Hemorrhois hippocrepis (Linnaeus, 1758)
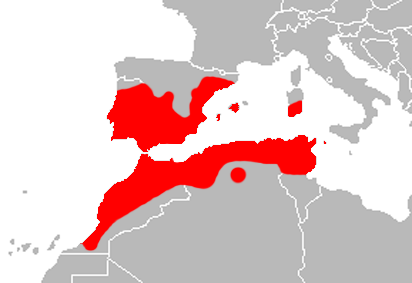

Synonyms
- Coluber hippocrepis Linnaeus, 1758; Natrix hippocrepis — Laurenti, 1768; Periops hippocrepis — Wagler, 1830; Calopeltis hippocrepis — Eichwald, 1851; Zamenis hippocrepis — Günther, 1858; Tyria hippocrepis — Cope, 1862; Hemorrhois hippocrepis — Utiger et al., 2002

= Horseshoe whip snake =

Species of snake

The horseshoe whip snake (Hemorrhois hippocrepis) is a species of snake in the family Colubridae. The species is native to southwestern Europe and northwestern Africa.

== Description ==
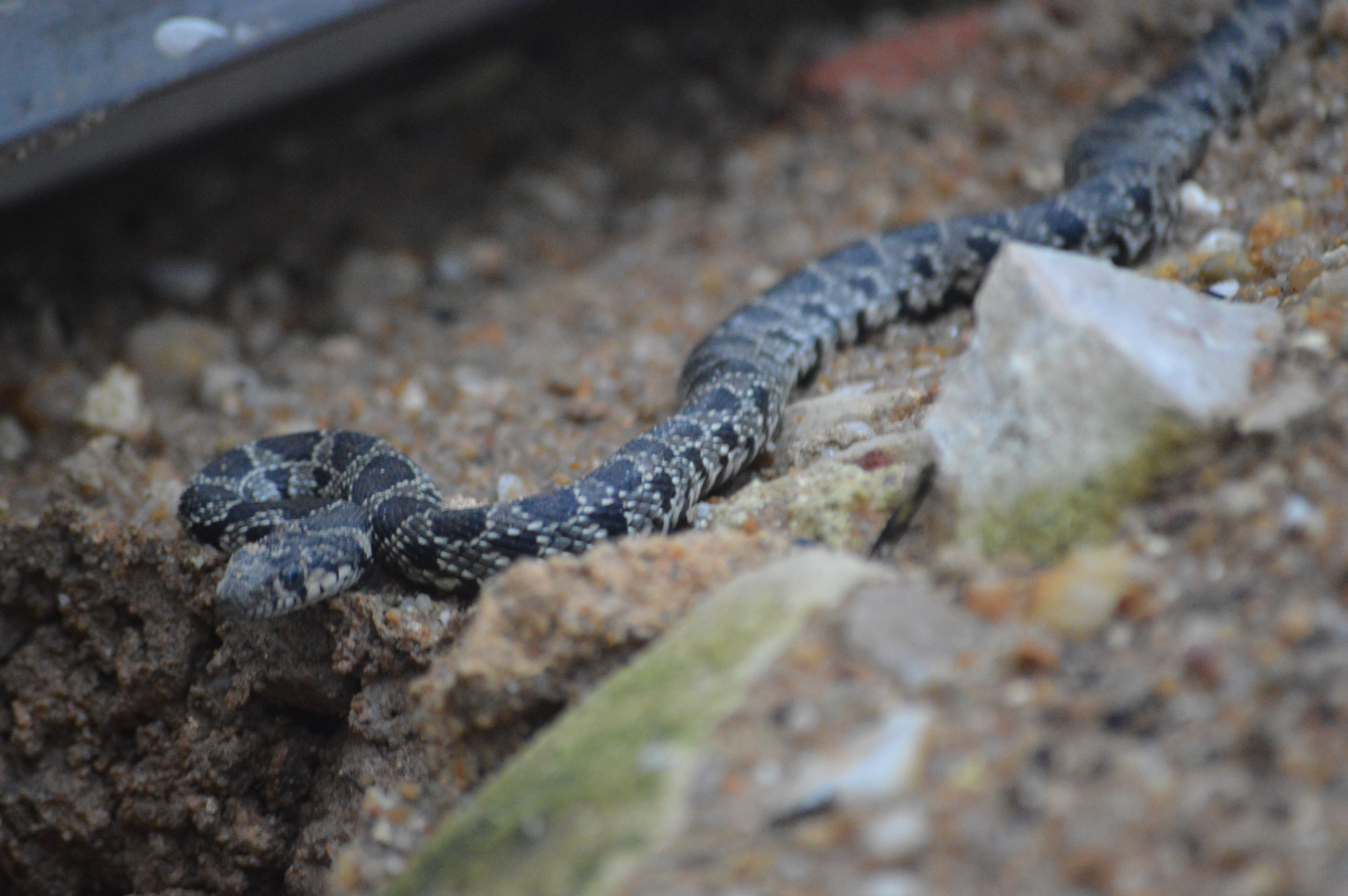
Adult Hemorrhois hippocrepis pictured in Leiria, Portugal

Adults of H. hippocrepis may attain a total length, including tail, of 1.5 to 1.8 m (5 to 6 feet), with no sexual dimorphism in body size. Its body is slender the head being wider than the neck. The eye is large, with a round pupil and a row of small scales below it. The smooth dorsal scales are arranged in 25-29 rows, and the ventrals number 220–258. Dorsally, it has a series of large spots which are either blackish or dark brown edged with black. There is a series of alternating smaller dark spots on each side. The lighter ground color between the spots may be yellowish, olive, or reddish. The dark spots are closely spaced, giving the appearance of a dark snake with a light pattern resembling a chain or a series of letters X. There is a light horseshoe-shaped mark on the neck and back of head.

== Geographic range ==
H. hippocrepis is found in Algeria, Morocco and Tunisia in North Africa, in southern and central Portugal, southern, eastern and central Spain, Gibraltar, southern Sardinia and Pantelleria Island in Europe. Since the early 2000s it has been reported in the Balearic Islands of Mallorca, Ibiza and Formentera. It is hypothesized to have been introduced by way of imported olive trees from mainland Spain. The species is thriving there and can grow larger than on the mainland.

== Habitat ==
The natural habitats of H. hippocrepis are Mediterranean-type shrubby vegetation, rocky areas, rocky shores, sandy shores, arable land, pastureland, plantations, rural gardens, and urban areas.

== Reproduction ==
H. hippocrepis is oviparous. Its reproductive cycle is seasonal, with oviposition occurring in early summer and hatching in late summer. Most sexually mature females reproduce once per year. The cycle is relatively fast, with a complete cycle including vitellogenesis, ovulation, shelling, and oviposition lasting approximately two months. A 1999 study found the mean clutch size to be 6.8 eggs and a positive correlation between fertility and female body size.

== Subspecies ==
Two subspecies are recognized as being valid, including the nominotypical subspecies.

- Hemorrhois hippocrepis hippocrepis (Linnaeus, 1758)
- Hemorrhois hippocrepis nigrescens (Cattaneo, 1985) Pantelleria

Nota bene: A trinomial authority in parentheses indicates that the subspecies was originally described in a genus other than Hemorrhois.

== Conservation status ==
The horseshoe whip snake is assessed as being of "Least Concern" by the International Union for Conservation of Nature in its Red List of Threatened Species. Its population trend is thought to be steady, and it is able to adapt to modified habitats. Threats it faces include being run over by traffic, poisoned by agricultural chemicals and being captured for use by local snake charmers.

== See also ==
- List of reptiles of Italy
