= Elaphe druzei =

Conservation status
- Endangered (IUCN 3.1)

Scientific classification
- Kingdom: Animalia
- Phylum: Chordata
- Class: Reptilia
- Order: Squamata
- Suborder: Serpentes
- Family: Colubridae
- Genus: Elaphe
- Species: E. druzei

Binomial name
- Elaphe druzei Jablonski, Ribeiro-Júnior & Meiri, 2023

Species of snake

Elaphe druzei, commonly known as the Levant rat snake, is a species of non-venomous snake in the subfamily Colubrinae of the family Colubridae. The species is native to northern Israel, Lebanon, and western Syria.

== Taxonomy ==
The species Elaphe druzei was formally described in a 2023 article published in Scientific Reports by Jablonski et al., following an integrative taxonomic study of Levantine rat snakes. The study combined morphological data with extensive molecular analyses, including mitochondrial DNA, nuclear DNA, and complete mitogenomes, to clarify the taxonomy of the Elaphe quatuorlineata group. The findings revealed that the population inhabiting Mt. Hermon and adjacent areas represents a deeply divergent lineage distinct from the other recognized species in the group: Elaphe quatuorlineata, Elaphe sauromates and Elaphe urartica. Based on both genetic and morphological distinctiveness, the authors described it as a new species, Elaphe druzei. Molecular clock dating places its divergence from other clade members at approximately 5.1–3.9 million years ago, during the Late Miocene to Pliocene, a period of major geological and climatic shifts in the region.

== Description ==
The newly described snake, Elaphe druzei, is a large, non-venomous colubrid, reaching a maximum total length (tail included) of approximately 1.5 m (4.9 ft), and an averaging total length of approximately 1 m (3.3 ft). It features very dark coloration and strongly keeled dorsal scales, traits that distinguish it from its closest relatives in the Elaphe (rat snake) group. The holotype is a female collected near Majdal Shams on Mt. Hermon at approximately 1,300 m (4,300 ft) elevation, currently preserved at the Steinhardt Museum of Natural History (TAU-R 19438).

== Geographic distribution ==
Elaphe druzei is endemic to the high-elevation mountains of the Southern Levant, including Mt. Hermon, with an estimated extent of occurrence of approximately 3,000 km² (1,158 sq mi). Its known geographic range spans regions within Israel, Lebanon, and Syria, isolated from other Elaphe populations by a gap of over 400 km (250 mi). Fossil and subfossil remains in the Hula Valley and Mt. Carmel indicate prior presence during the Pleistocene and Natufian (~12,000 years ago) periods.

== Ecology ==
Elaphe druzei is non-venomous, non-aggressive, and generally cryptic. It is considered extremely rare and one of the Western Palearctic’s rarest snakes. Threats include land-use change, tourism development (e.g., ski resort on Mt. Hermon), habitat degradation due to military activity, climate change, and persecution. It likely qualifies as Endangered (IUCN criteria B1 & B2), based on limited range, fragmented habitat, and ongoing decline. In Israel, it is legally protected and largely confined to a nature reserve; no formal protection exists within Lebanon or Syria.
