= Elaphe praelongissima =

Elaphe praelongissima Temporal range: Neogene

Scientific classification
- Kingdom: Animalia
- Phylum: Chordata
- Class: Reptilia
- Order: Squamata
- Suborder: Serpentes
- Family: Colubridae
- Genus: Elaphe
- Species: †E. praelongissima

Binomial name
- †Elaphe praelongissima Venczel, 1994

Extinct species of colubrid snake

Elaphe praelongissima is an extinct species of colubrid snake in the genus Elaphe that lived in Eurasia during the Late Miocene subepoch of the Neogene period.

== Distribution ==
Fossils of E. praelongissima are known from Hungary. Remains bearing a very high affinity to the species but not able to be diagnosed to the specific level are also known from China.

== Description ==
E. praelongissima is diagnosed by its short Vidian canals, its basiparasphenoid possessing a small frontal step, and its suborbital flanges being reduced. Its vertebrae have vaulted neural arches, concave or notched zygosphenes, short centra, and obtuse prezygapophyseal processes.
