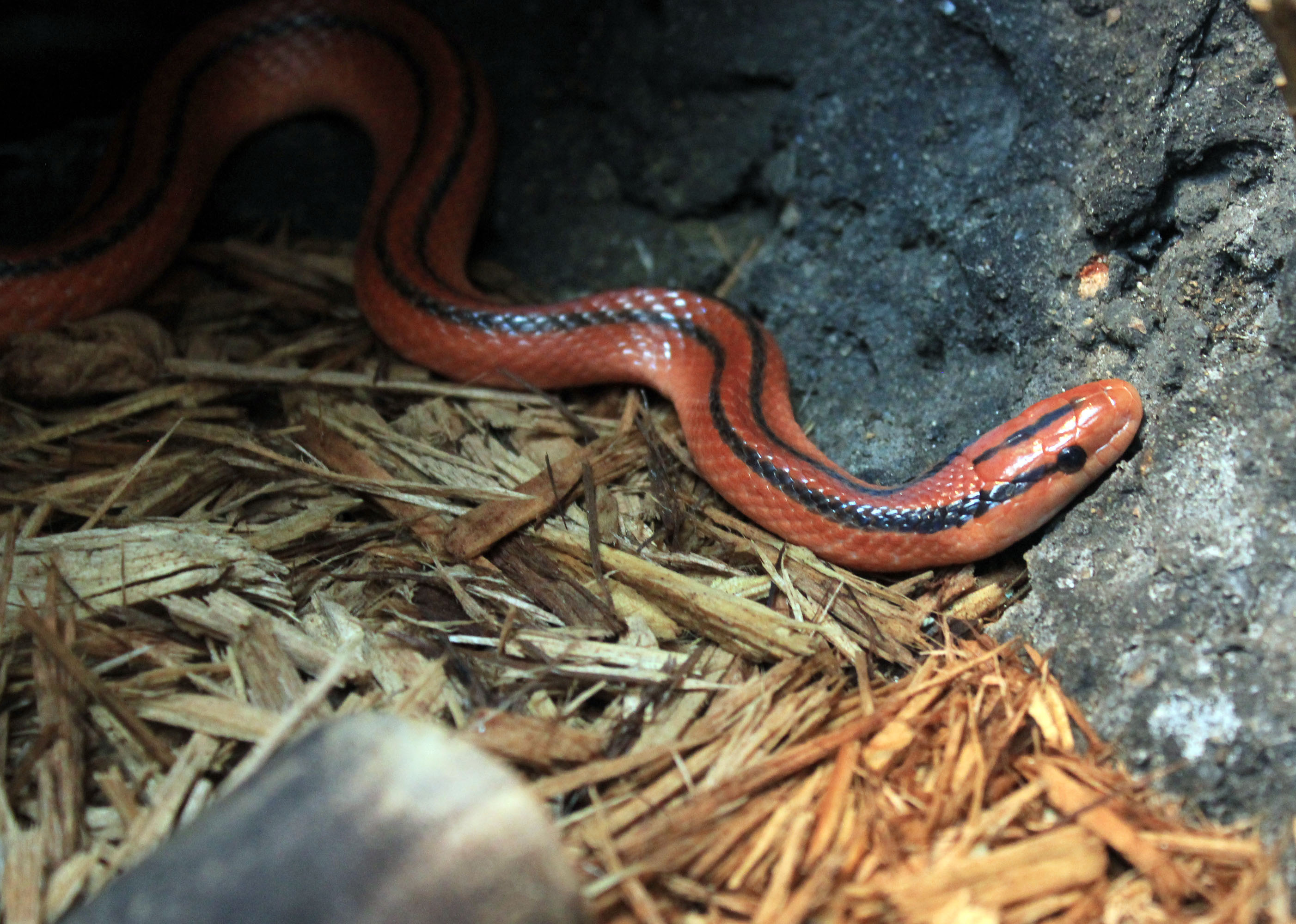
- Red mountain rat snake (Oreocryptophis porphyraceus coxi)

Conservation status
- Least Concern (IUCN 3.1)

Scientific classification
- Kingdom: Animalia
- Phylum: Chordata
- Class: Reptilia
- Order: Squamata
- Suborder: Serpentes
- Family: Colubridae
- Genus: Oreocryptophis; Utiger, Schätti and Helfenberger, 2005
- Species: O. porphyraceus

Binomial name
- Oreocryptophis porphyraceus (Cantor, 1839)

Synonyms
- Elaphe porphyracea; Oreophis porphyraceus; Simotes vaillanti; Liopeltis kawkamii

= Oreocryptophis =

Genus of snakes

Oreocryptophis porphyraceus is a rat snake species, commonly called the black-banded trinket snake, red bamboo snake, found in mid to upper-level elevations of forested hills in southeastern Asia, ranging from evergreen tropical to dry seasonal forests depending on the subspecies and locality. It is the only member of the genus Oreocryptophis, but it was formerly placed in Elaphe.

== Description ==
The head is small, sharp and squarish, while the color pattern includes red or orange colors, along with black bands or stripes. A terrestrial species, it has a preference for cool climates that restricts its habitat to hills and mountain plateaus. It is known to be crepuscular, active during the late evenings till night and dawn till late mornings. In captivity, it is one of the most sought-after rat snake species.

== Distribution ==
India (Darjeeling, Sikkim, Assam, Arunachal Pradesh (Miao, Namdapha - Changlang district, Itanagar - Papum Pare district), Myanmar, Bhutan, Thailand, Laos, Cambodia, Vietnam, Nepal, South China (Tibet, Sichuan, Yunnan, Hong Kong, Hainan, northward to Henan and Gansu; south to Wei He river), Taiwan, West Malaysia (Cameron Highlands, Pahang), Indonesia (Sumatra). The type locality given is "India: Assam, Mishmi [Mishmee] Hills." It is also reported from Lowachhara National Park of North-eastern Bangladesh

== Habitat ==
These rat snakes thrive under cool and very humid conditions. On many occasions they are found at altitudes exceeding 800 meters in evergreen moist rainforest or monsoon forests, depending on the subspecies and locality. They spend most of the time hiding in leaf litter, under moss carpets, or under rocks and logs.

== Diet ==
The diet consists primarily of rodents and other small mammals in the wild. Frogs are a possibility. In captivity, mice are accepted readily.

== Subspecies ==
Subspecies	Geographic range
O. p. porphyraceus	Bhutan; India; Laos; Myanmar; Nepal; China, Thailand, Vietnam
O. p. coxi	NW Thailand
O. p. kawakamii	Taiwan
O. p. laticinctus	Indonesia, Peninsular Malaysia, Sumatra
O. p. vaillanti	China, Vietnam
O. p. pulchra	China
