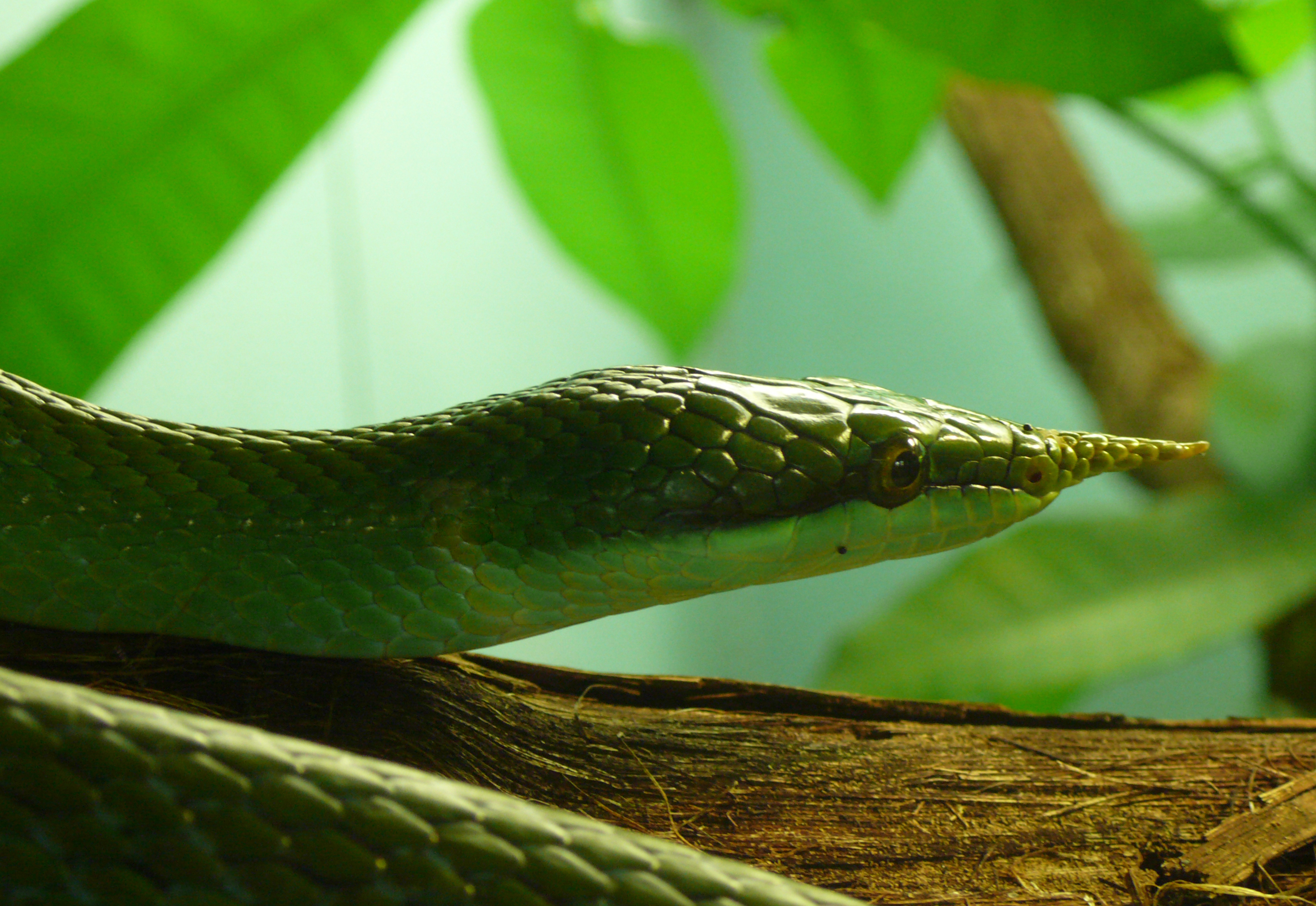

Conservation status
- Least Concern (IUCN 3.1)

Scientific classification
- Kingdom: Animalia
- Phylum: Chordata
- Class: Reptilia
- Order: Squamata
- Suborder: Serpentes
- Family: Colubridae
- Genus: Gonyosoma
- Species: G. boulengeri

Binomial name
- Gonyosoma boulengeri (Mocquard, 1897)

Synonyms
- Rhynchophis boulengeri Mocquard, 1897; Proboscidophis versicolor Fan, 1931; Rhynchophis boulengeri — M.A. Smith, 1943; Gonyosoma boulengeri — Chen et al., 2014

= Rhinoceros ratsnake =

Species of snake

The rhinoceros ratsnake (Gonyosoma boulengeri), also known commonly as the rhinoceros snake, rhino rat snake, and Vietnamese longnose snake, is a species of nonvenomous ratsnake in the family Colubridae. The species is found from northern Vietnam to southern China. It has a prominent, distinctive, scaled protrusion on the front of its snout, which has led to its common naming after a rhinoceros.

== Etymology ==
The specific name, boulengeri, is in honor of Belgian-British biologist George Albert Boulenger.

== Geographic range ==
G. boulengeri is found in northern Vietnam including Tam Dao, and in southern China. During a 2001 survey, 10 specimens were observed in Yên Bái Province, northern Vietnam.

== Description ==
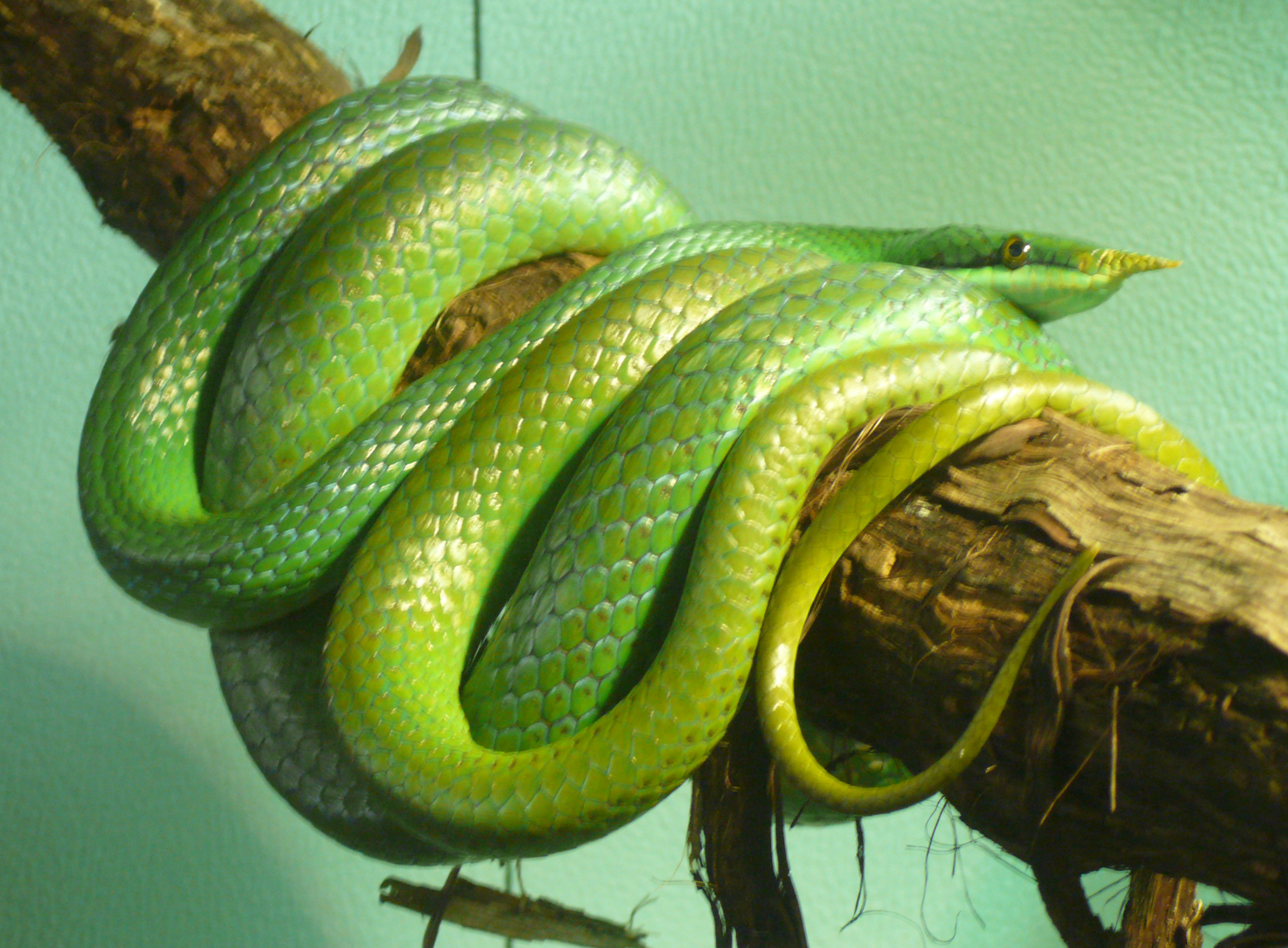
Rhinoceros ratsnake showing full body coils

The adult size of G. boulengeri is 100–160 cm (39–63 in) in total length (including tail). Its scale count includes 19 rows of dorsals at midbody.

== Natural history ==
The rhinoceros ratsnake inhabits subtropical rainforests at elevations between 300 and 1,100 m (980 and 3,610 ft), particularly valleys with streams. It is generally arboreal, and mostly diurnal, hunting small mice and other rodents, birds, and perhaps other vertebrate prey. Oviparous, its mating season from April to May may produce five to 10 eggs in a clutch. After 60 days' incubation, hatchlings are 30–35 cm (12–14 in) total length, brownish grey with dark edges on several dorsal scales. As they mature, rhinoceros ratsnakes change color to steel grey at about 12–14 months, then to a bluish green or green adult hue at about 24 months. However, a rare few individuals maintain their steel grey subadult color and do not pass into ordinarily mature color phase. Studies conducted by Bangor University have suggested that the nasal protrusion is used for mating displays in which the males may 'fence' off rivals. Other studies have found little correlation between the use of the nasal protrusion and courtship displays, which may suggest the true function is still unknown.
