= Eastern trinket snake =

Conservation status
- Least Concern (IUCN 3.1)

Scientific classification
- Kingdom: Animalia
- Phylum: Chordata
- Class: Reptilia
- Order: Squamata
- Suborder: Serpentes
- Family: Colubridae
- Genus: Elaphe
- Species: E. cantoris

Binomial name
- Elaphe cantoris (Boulenger, 1894)

Synonyms
- Coluber cantoris Boulenger, 1894; Elaphe cantoris — M.A. Smith, 1943; Gonyosoma cantoris — Wallach, 1997; Orthriophis cantoris — Utiger et al., 2002; Elaphe cantoris — Chen et al., 2017

Species of snake

The eastern trinket snake (Elaphe cantoris) is a species of snake in the family Colubridae. The species is endemic to South Asia.

== Etymology ==
The specific name, cantoris, is in honor of Danish zoologist Theodore Edward Cantor.

== Geographic range ==
E. cantoris is found in the Himalayas in Bhutan, India (Assam, Darjeeling, Sikkim), Myanmar, and Nepal. The type locality is the Khasi and Garo Hills in Meghalaya.

== Habitat ==
The preferred natural habitat of E. cantoris is mountain forest at elevations of 1,000–2,300 m (3,300–7,500 ft).

== Description ==
E. cantoris is a large species, and may grow to a total length (including tail) of almost 2 m (6.6 ft). Dorsally, it has a brownish ground color, which is overlaid by a series of squarish dark brown blotches. Ventrally, it is yellowish anteriorly, becoming pinkish posteriorly.

== Behavior ==
E. cantoris is partly arboreal.

== Reproduction ==
E. cantoris is oviparous. In India, sexually mature females lay eggs in late July, with an average clutch size of 10 eggs.
