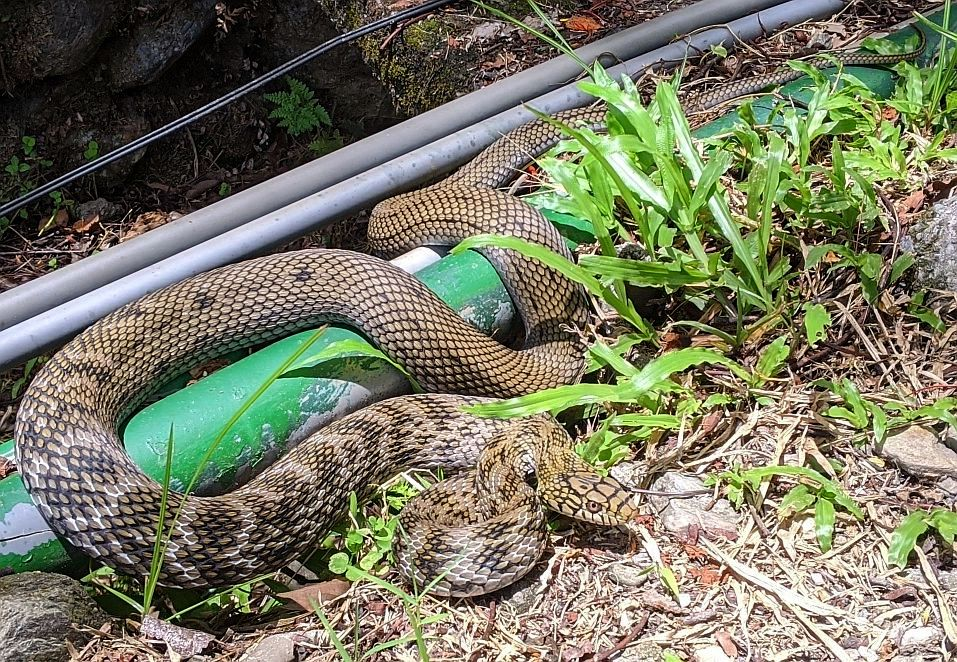

Conservation status
- Least Concern (IUCN 3.1)

Scientific classification
- Kingdom: Animalia
- Phylum: Chordata
- Class: Reptilia
- Order: Squamata
- Suborder: Serpentes
- Family: Colubridae
- Genus: Elaphe
- Species: E. carinata

Binomial name
- Elaphe carinata (Günther, 1864)

= Elaphe carinata =

King ratsnake

Species of snake

Elaphe carinata, the king ratsnake, is a species of Colubrid snake found in Southeast and East Asia.

== Description ==
Elaphe carinata is a large species of snake with total length up to 240 cm (7.9 ft). It is an active, predatory snake that preys extensively on mice, birds, bird eggs and frogs, and sometimes on grasshoppers, beetles, lizards or other snakes.

== Taxonomy ==
=== Etymology ===
The common name refers to its habit of eating other snakes, including venomous species such as the sharp-nosed viper. It suffocates its prey by constriction, similar to the hunting technique of boas and pythons. Elaphe carinata also preys on rodents and other small animals. They are opportunistic hunters and will even forage nests.

It is also known as Taiwan stink snake and stinking goddess, referring to this species' highly developed post-anal glands, which are frequently emptied when the snake is picked up, resulting in a very strong, unpleasant odour.

=== Classification ===
This species shares similar characteristics and behaviours with Lampropeltis, Thamnophis, and Ophiophagus. However, regardless of speculation among herpetoculturists, the king ratsnake shares very little direct genetic relationship with them. Aside from appearance, the perceived similarity is due in part to the dietary habits of the king ratsnake, in particular its preference for ectothermic prey such as snakes and lizards, as well as invertebrates.

In actuality, they share much in common genetically with other Eurasian rat snakes such as the Russian rat snake (Elaphe schrenkii) and the Japanese rat snake (Elaphe climacophora). They may also share a common lineage with the genera Coelognathus, Gonyosoma and Orthriophis. External morphological characteristics and behaviour alone are generally not considered reliable keys to taxonomic relationships between species, as the majority of current classification is now based on DNA evidence. The superficial resemblance to American kingsnakes is more likely an example of convergent evolution, much like the similarities between the South American emerald tree boa (Corallus caninus) and the Indo-Australian green tree python (Morelia viridis).

== Distribution ==
Elaphe carinata is found in China, northern Vietnam, Taiwan, and Japan (Ryukyu Islands).

== Commercial use ==
Elaphe carinata is one of the major species in the snake trade in China, particularly in the skin trade but also that of live animals; it is the most commonly available snake in restaurants.

The king ratsnake is also found in the exotic pet trade. Although once considered undesirable due to their nervous nature and strong odour, this species is growing in popularity among keepers. There are also several genetic colour mutations that are being bred, one being Albino.
