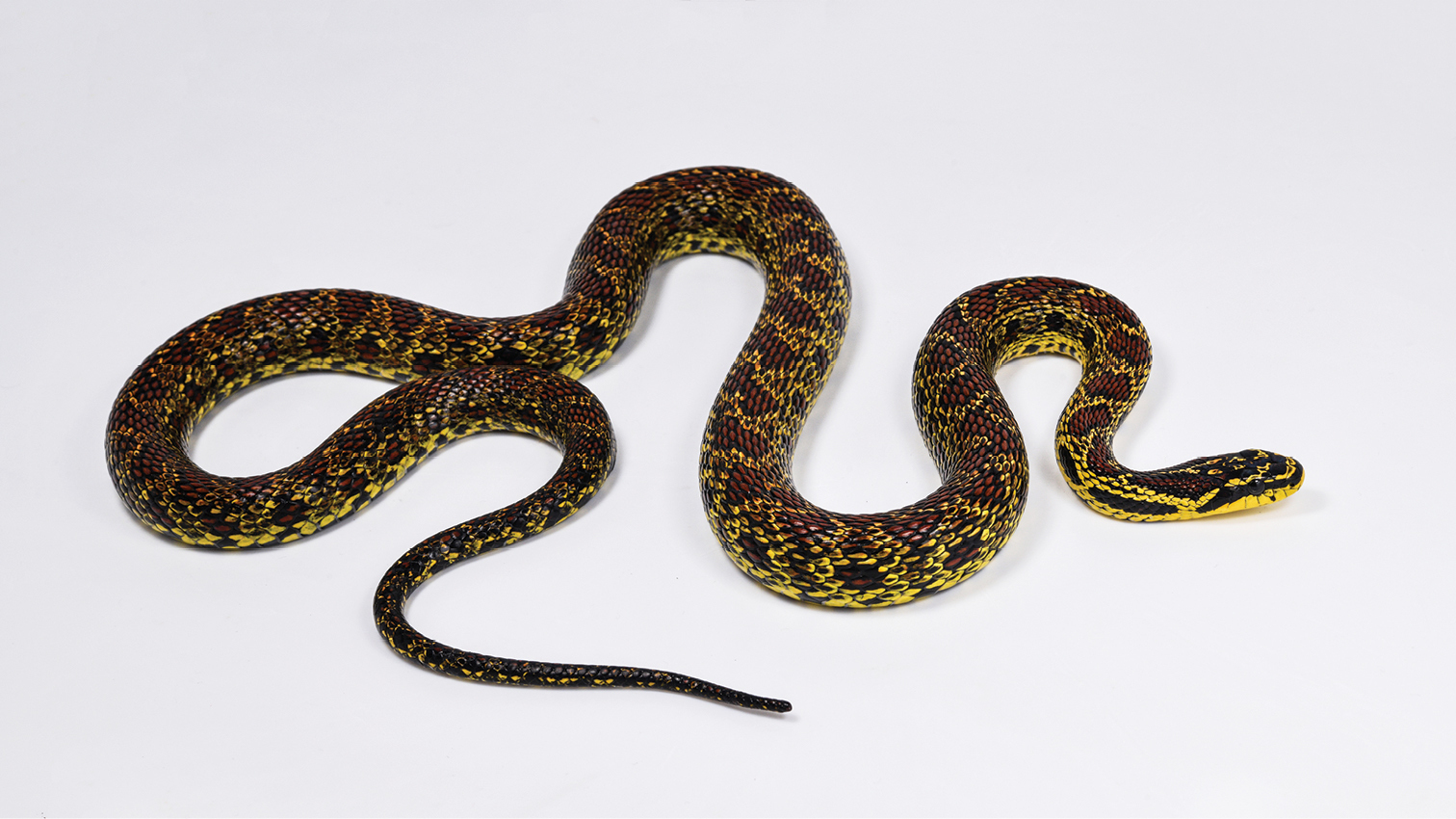

Scientific classification
- Kingdom: Animalia
- Phylum: Chordata
- Class: Reptilia
- Order: Squamata
- Suborder: Serpentes
- Family: Colubridae
- Genus: Elaphe
- Species: E. xiphodonta

Binomial name
- Elaphe xiphodonta Qi, Shi, Ma, Gao, Bu, Grismer, Li & Wang, 2021

= Elaphe xiphodonta =

Species of snake

Elaphe xiphodonta, the Qin Emperor rat snake or blade-toothed rat snake, is a species of non-venomous snake in the family Colubridae. The species is found in China.
