= Elaphe zoigeensis =

Conservation status
- Least Concern (IUCN 3.1)

Scientific classification
- Kingdom: Animalia
- Phylum: Chordata
- Class: Reptilia
- Order: Squamata
- Suborder: Serpentes
- Family: Colubridae
- Genus: Elaphe
- Species: E. zoigeensis

Binomial name
- Elaphe zoigeensis Huang, Ding, Burbrink, Yang, Huang, Ling, Chen & Zhang, 2012

Species of snake

Elaphe zoigeensis is a species of snakes of the family Colubridae. It is endemic to Sichuan, China. Common name Zoige rat snake has been coined for it.

== Geographic range ==
The snake is found in Sichuan, China. Its type locality is in Zoigê County.
