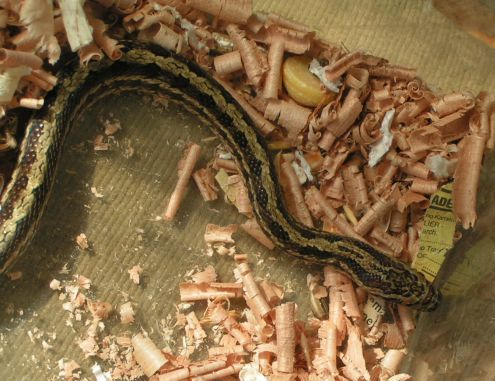
- Twin-spotted ratsnake

Conservation status
- Least Concern (IUCN 3.1)

Scientific classification
- Kingdom: Animalia
- Phylum: Chordata
- Class: Reptilia
- Order: Squamata
- Suborder: Serpentes
- Family: Colubridae
- Genus: Elaphe
- Species: E. bimaculata

Binomial name
- Elaphe bimaculata (Schmidt, 1925)
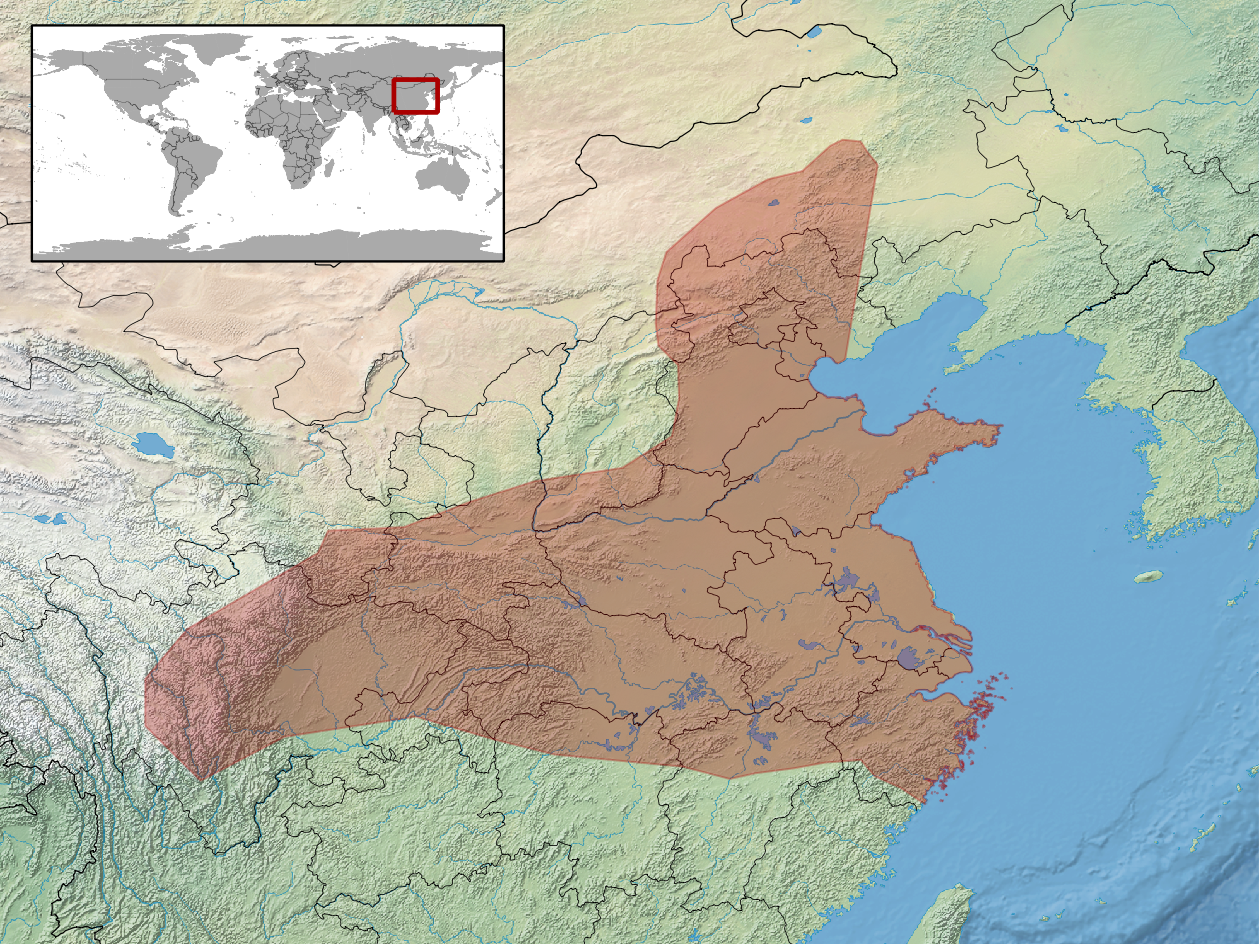

= Elaphe bimaculata =

Twin-spotted ratsnake

Species of snake

Elaphe bimaculata, the twin-spotted ratsnake or Chinese leopard snake, is a small ratsnake (60–80 cm) found in China. It occurs as both blotched and striped phase, with the blotched type being the more common or "typical" phase. Some specimens even exhibit a pattern of half blotched, half striped where the anterior half is usually blotched and the posterior half striped. They are found in many habitats ranging from the edge of forest to cultivated areas and seem to like cooler temperatures and higher humidity. This secretive snake prefers smaller food items such as young to half grown mice. E. bimaculata has been known to breed at different times of the year, usually with 3-10 eggs being laid in late spring; eggs require 35–48 days of incubation. A period of 2–3 months hibernation is typical. Females are known to grow larger and heavier than males.
