= Elaphe davidi =

Conservation status
- Least Concern (IUCN 3.1)

Scientific classification
- Kingdom: Animalia
- Phylum: Chordata
- Class: Reptilia
- Order: Squamata
- Suborder: Serpentes
- Family: Colubridae
- Genus: Elaphe
- Species: E. davidi

Binomial name
- Elaphe davidi (Sauvage, 1884)

Synonyms
- Tropidonotus davidi Sauvage, 1884; Coluber davidi — Boulenger, 1894; Coluber halli Boulenger, 1914; Elaphe davidi — Mell, 1931

Species of snake

Elaphe davidi, also known commonly as Pere David's rat snake, is a species of snake in subfamily Colubrinae of the family Colubridae. The species is native to East Asia.

== Etymology ==
The specific name, davidi, is in honor of Armand David, who was a French zoologist and priest.

== Geographic range ==
Elaphe davidi is found mainly in China, and its presence in North Korea is considered uncertain.

== Habitat ==
The preferred natural habitats of Elaphe davidi are forest and grassland, at altitudes of 100–900 m (330–2,950 ft), but it has also been found in agricultural areas such as orchards.

== Diet ==
Elaphe davidi preys upon frogs, lizards, and snakes. Captive specimens have also eaten mice.

== Reproduction ==
Elaphe davidi is oviparous. Eggs are laid in August, and clutch size is 7–8.
