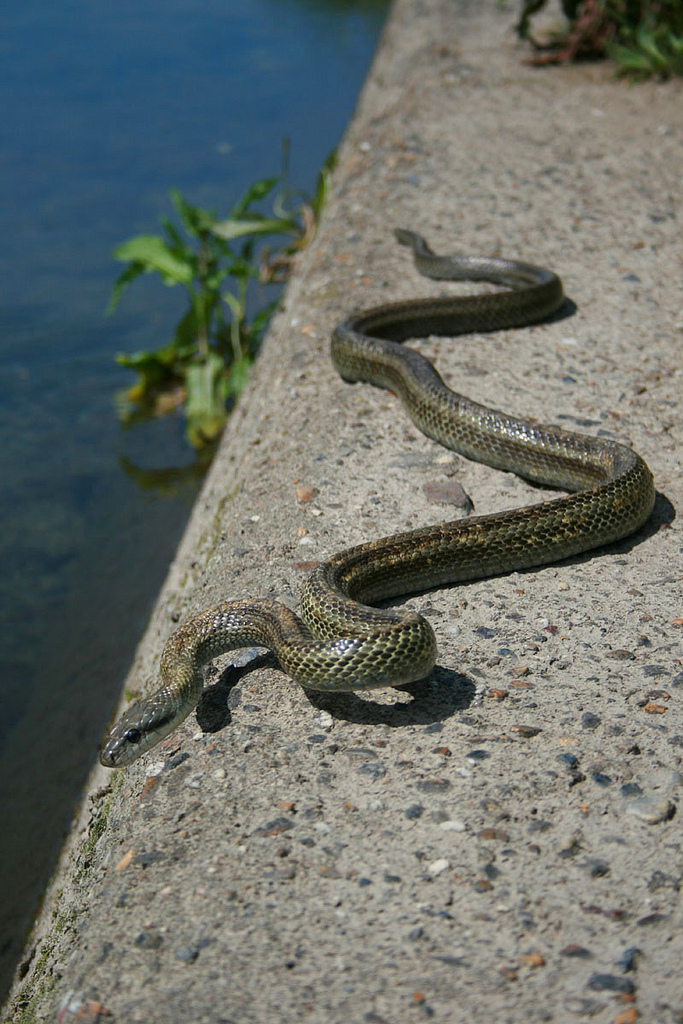

Conservation status
- Least Concern (IUCN 3.1)

Scientific classification
- Kingdom: Animalia
- Phylum: Chordata
- Class: Reptilia
- Order: Squamata
- Suborder: Serpentes
- Family: Colubridae
- Genus: Elaphe
- Species: E. climacophora

Binomial name
- Elaphe climacophora (Boie, 1826)

= Japanese rat snake =

Species of snake

The Japanese rat snake (Elaphe climacophora) is a medium-sized colubrid snake found throughout the Japanese archipelago (except the far South West) as well as on the Russian-administered Kunashir Island. In Japanese it is known as the aodaishō or "blue general". It is non-venomous and is hunted by eagles and tanukis.

The snakes brumate for three to four months, mate in spring and lay 7–20 eggs in early summer.

== Description ==
Adults reach one to two meters in length and about five centimeters in girth. E. climacophora is the largest Japanese snake outside Okinawa. They are variable in color, ranging from pale yellow-green to dark blue-green. They can be identified as Asian rat snakes due to the dark streak behind each of their eyes.

Juveniles have brown-stripe pattern that may be mimesis of the venomous mamushi. There is an established, albino population in the wild, with specimens especially numerous near Iwakuni, where they are called "Iwakuni white snakes" and revered as messengers of deities and deity-guardians of mountains and rivers. The albino population was protected in 1924 as a "national monument."

== Feeding ==
Japanese rat snakes eat a variety of small animals: rodents, frogs, lizards, shrews, or flies. They are also among the species of snake to have the ability to eat raw eggs. As semi-arboreal snakes, they often raid bird nests in the wild. They were favoured by farmers as effective rat control, though unpopular with chicken rearers.

== Hybrids ==
In the German reptile zoo Exotarium Oberhof Elaphe climacophora mated with Elaphe schrenckii to produce fertile hybrids. Offspring look very much like Elaphe taeniura.
