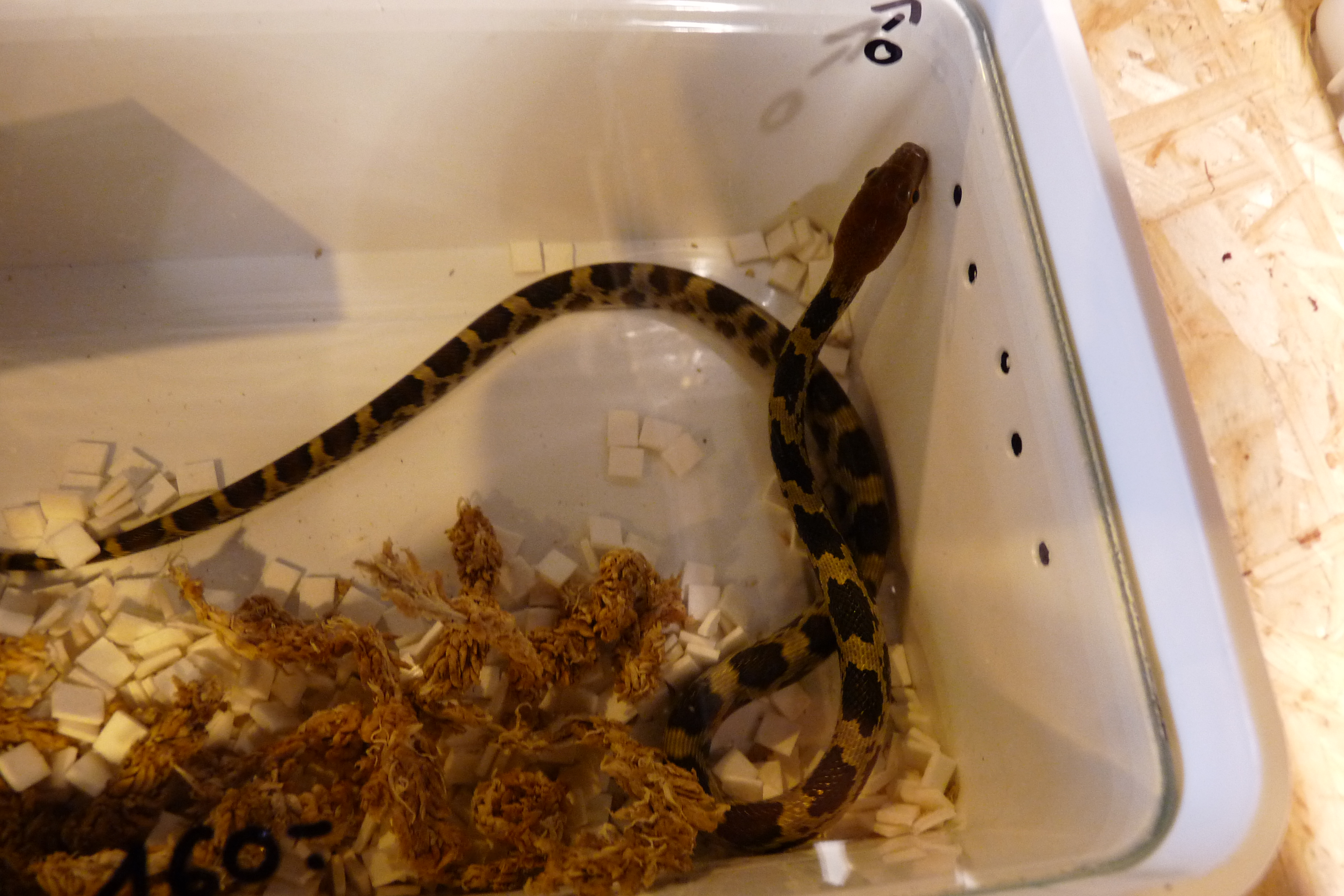
- A juvenile flower snake

Conservation status
- Vulnerable (IUCN 3.1)

Scientific classification
- Kingdom: Animalia
- Phylum: Chordata
- Class: Reptilia
- Order: Squamata
- Suborder: Serpentes
- Family: Colubridae
- Genus: Elaphe
- Species: E. moellendorffi

Binomial name
- Elaphe moellendorffi (Boettger, 1886)

Synonyms
- Cynophis moellendorffi Boettger, 1886; Coluber moellendorffi — Boulenger, 1894; Elaphe moellendorffi — Stejneger, 1907; Amblycephalus moellendorffi — Deuve, 1961; Orthriophis moellendorffi — Utiger et al., 2002; Elaphe moellendorffi — Chen et al., 2017

= Elaphe moellendorffi =

Species of snake

Elaphe moellendorffi, commonly called the flower snake, Moellendorf's rat snake, and Moellendorff's trinket snake, is a species of snake in the subfamily Colubrinae of the family Colubridae. The species is native to mainland Southeast Asia.

== Etymology ==
The specific name, moellendorffi, is in honor of German malacologist Otto Franz von Möllendorff.

== Geographic distribution and Habitat ==
Elaphe moellendorffi is found in China (Guangdong, Guangxi) and Vietnam (Hòa Bình). It may possibly also occur in Laos.

The preferred natural habitats of Elaphe moellendorffi are limestone caves and rocky areas of shrubland and forest, at elevations of 30–300 m (98–984 ft).

== Description ==
Elaphe moellendorffi is a large snake. Adults may attain a total length (including tail) of 1.66 m (5.4 ft).

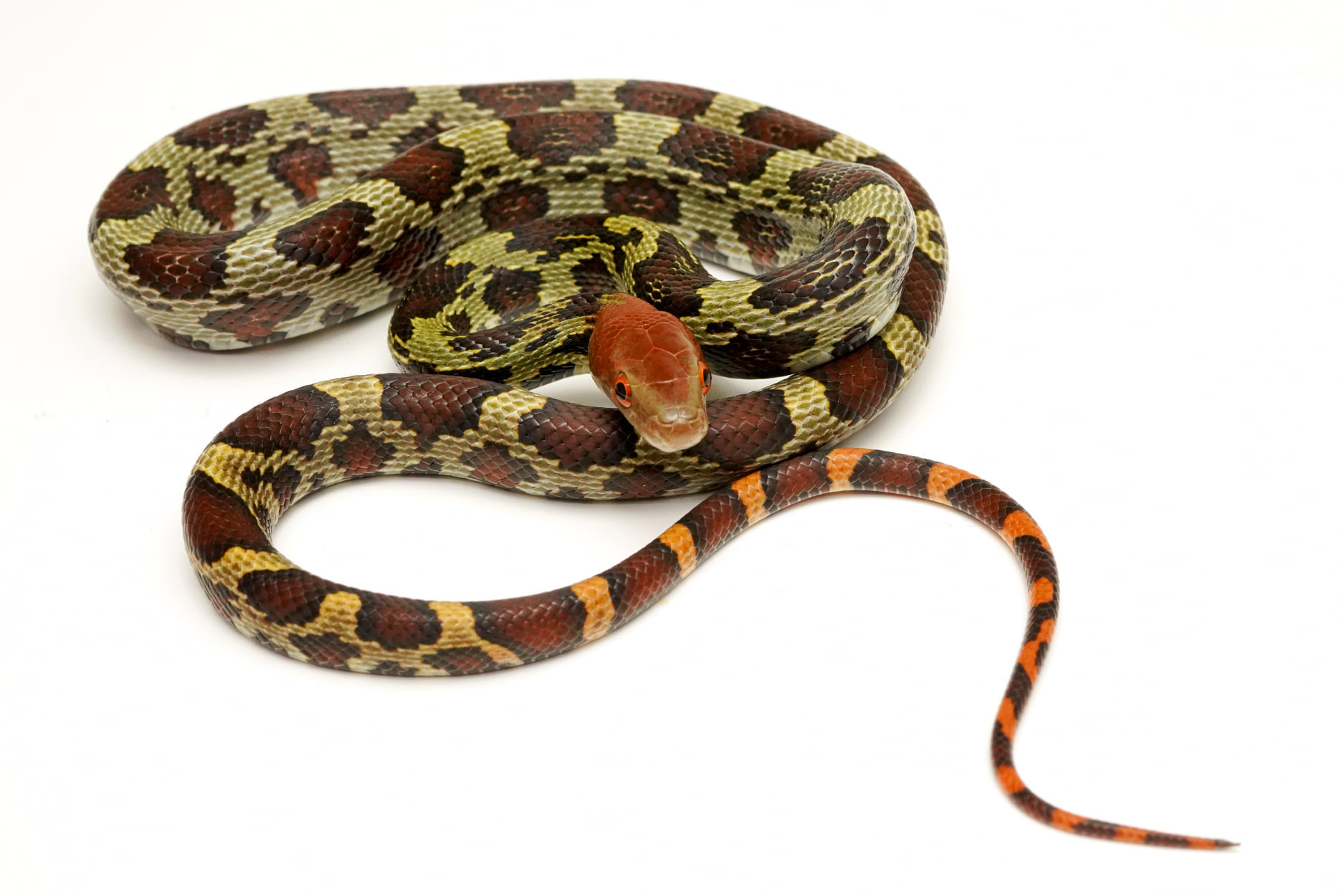
A subadult Elaphe moellendorffi

== Behavior ==
Elaphe moellendorffi is terrestrial and partly arboreal.

== Diet ==
Elaphe moellendorffi preys upon frogs, lizards, rodents, bats, and birds.

== Reproduction ==
Elaphe moellendorffi is oviparous. Clutch size is seven to ten eggs.
