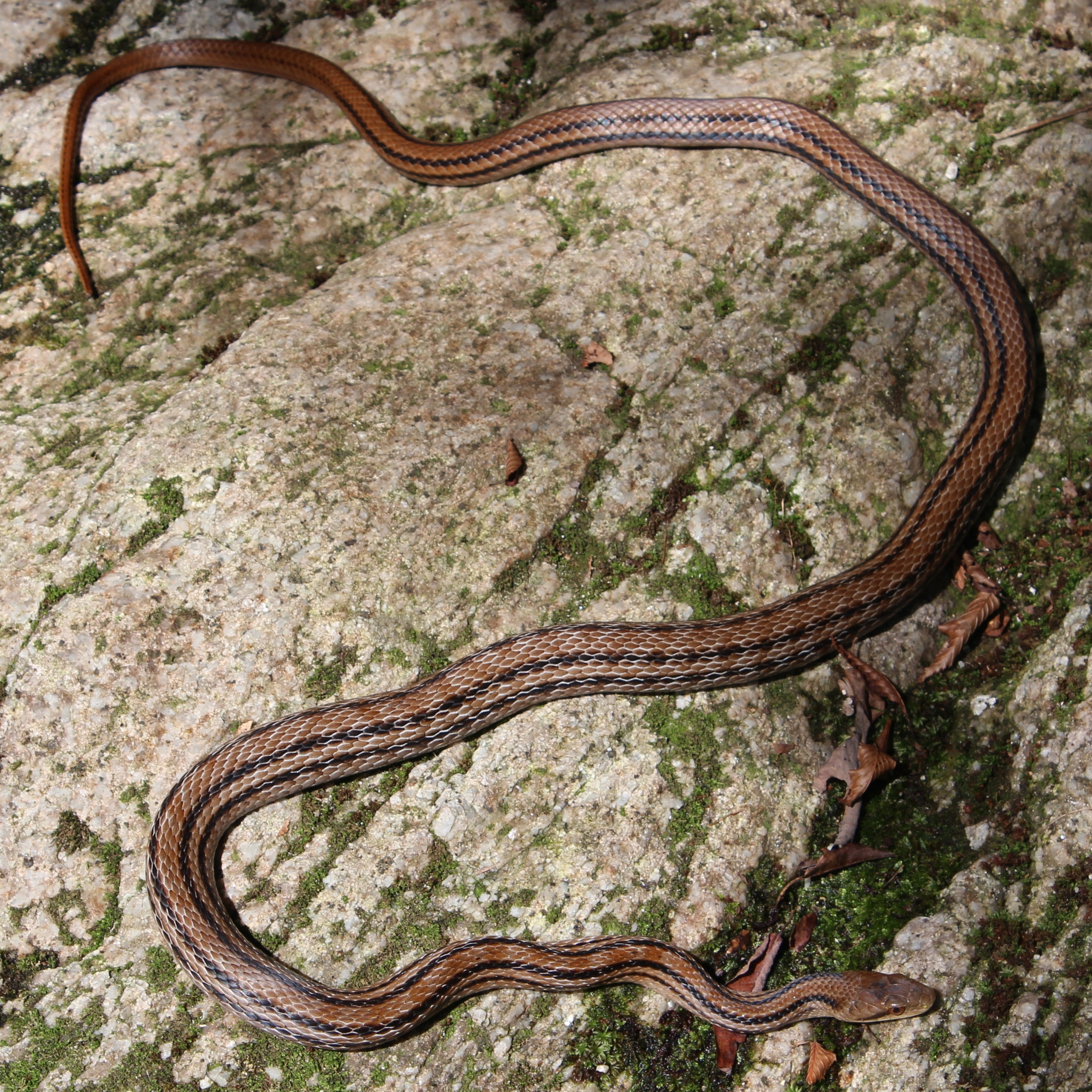

Conservation status
- Least Concern (IUCN 3.1)

Scientific classification
- Kingdom: Animalia
- Phylum: Chordata
- Class: Reptilia
- Order: Squamata
- Suborder: Serpentes
- Family: Colubridae
- Genus: Elaphe
- Species: E. quadrivirgata

Binomial name
- Elaphe quadrivirgata (H. Boie, 1826)

Synonyms
- Coluber quadrivirgatus H.Boie, 1826; Composoma quadrivirgatum — A.M.C. Duméril, Bibron & A.H.A. Duméril, 1854; Elaphis quadrivirgatus — Günther, 1858; Coluber quadrivirgatus — Boulenger, 1894; Elaphe quadrivirgata — Stejneger, 1907

= Japanese striped snake =

Japanese four-lined ratsnake

Species of snake

Elaphe quadrivirgata, commonly known as the Japanese four-lined ratsnake or the Japanese striped snake (Japanese: shimahebi = striped snake), is a species of non-venomous colubrid snake native to Japan.

== Geographic range ==
It is found in all areas of Japan apart from the Ryukyu Islands.

== Description ==
It typically grows to a length of 1-1.5 m (40–60 in). The snake has a yellow or light brown ground color, and gets its scientific and common names from the four black lengthwise stripes sported by most individuals of the species. All-black variants exist; these are known in Japan as karasu-hebi (crow snakes).

Juveniles are reddish, and instead of lengthwise stripes have crosswise stripes and a spotted pattern similar to some venomous snakes. photo

The dorsal scales, which are weakly keeled in adults but may be smooth in juveniles, are arranged in 19 rows. The ventrals, which are angulate laterally, number 193–210. The anal scale is usually divided, and the subcaudals, which are also divided (paired), number 70–96.

== Behavior ==
Elaphe quadrivirgata is an active, diurnal snake.

== Diet ==
It feeds on a variety of prey items, including frogs, lizards, insects, rodents, as well as birds and their eggs.

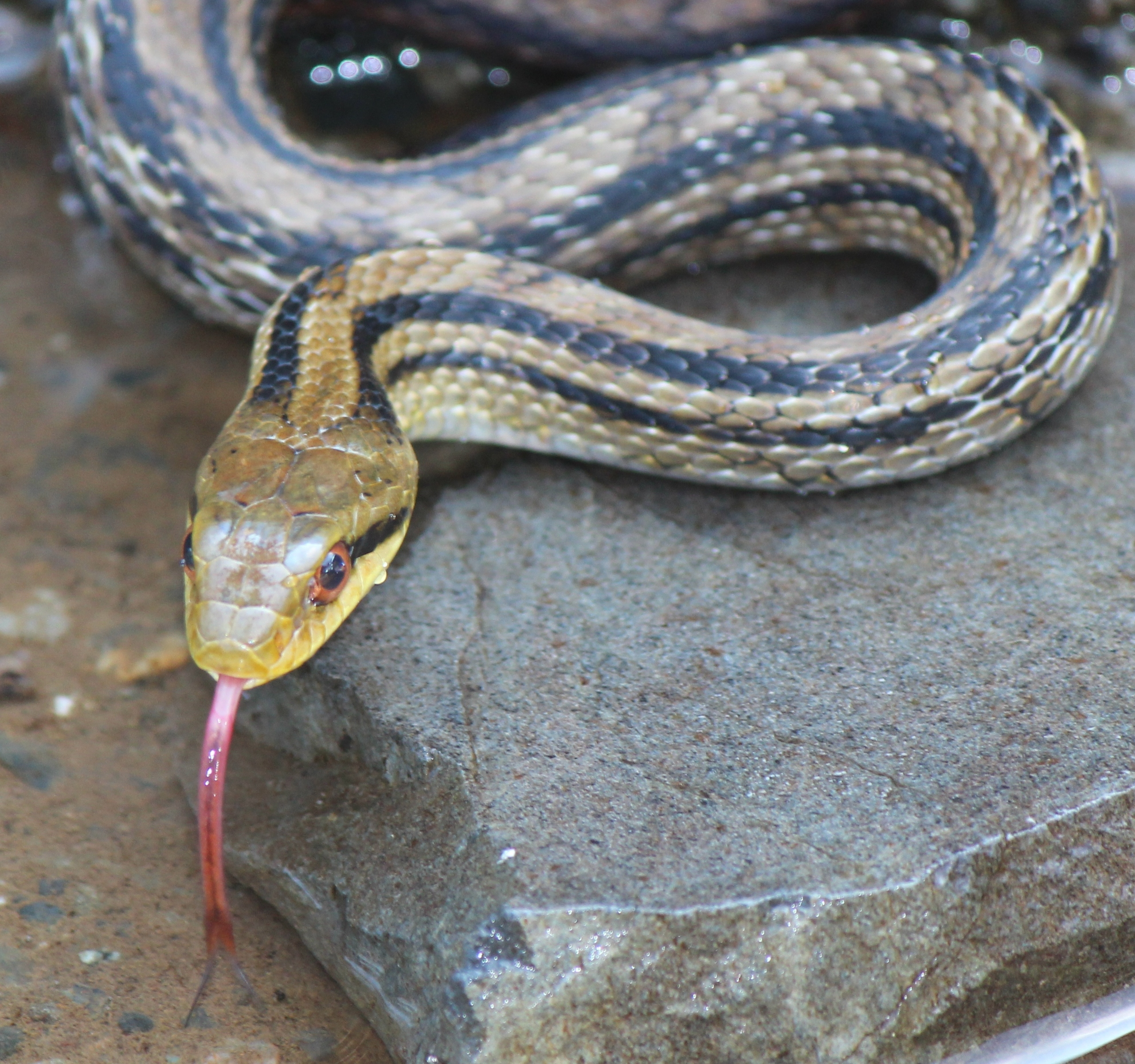
Close-up of head, Mount Yōrō, Japan.

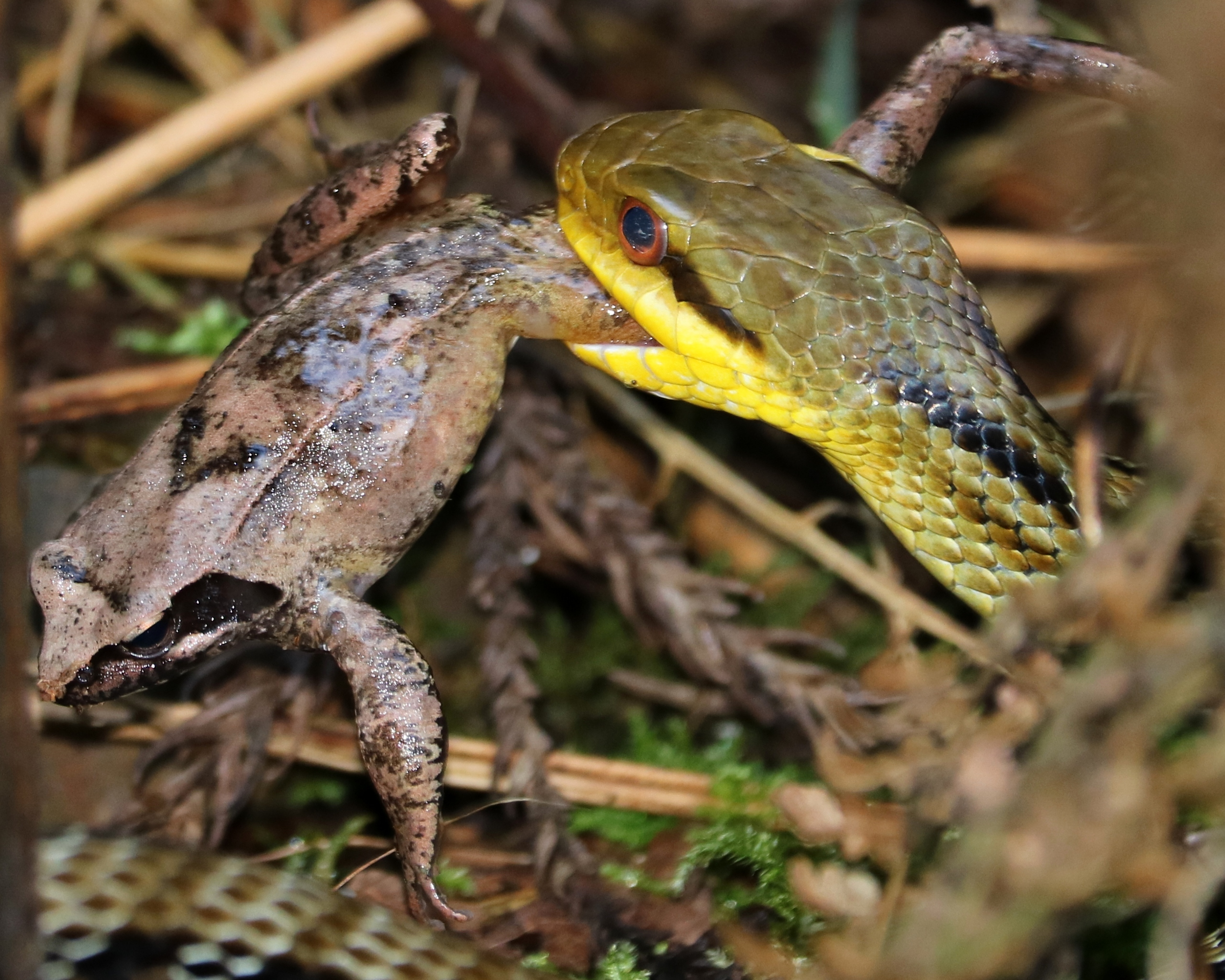
Capturing frog (Rana ornativentris)

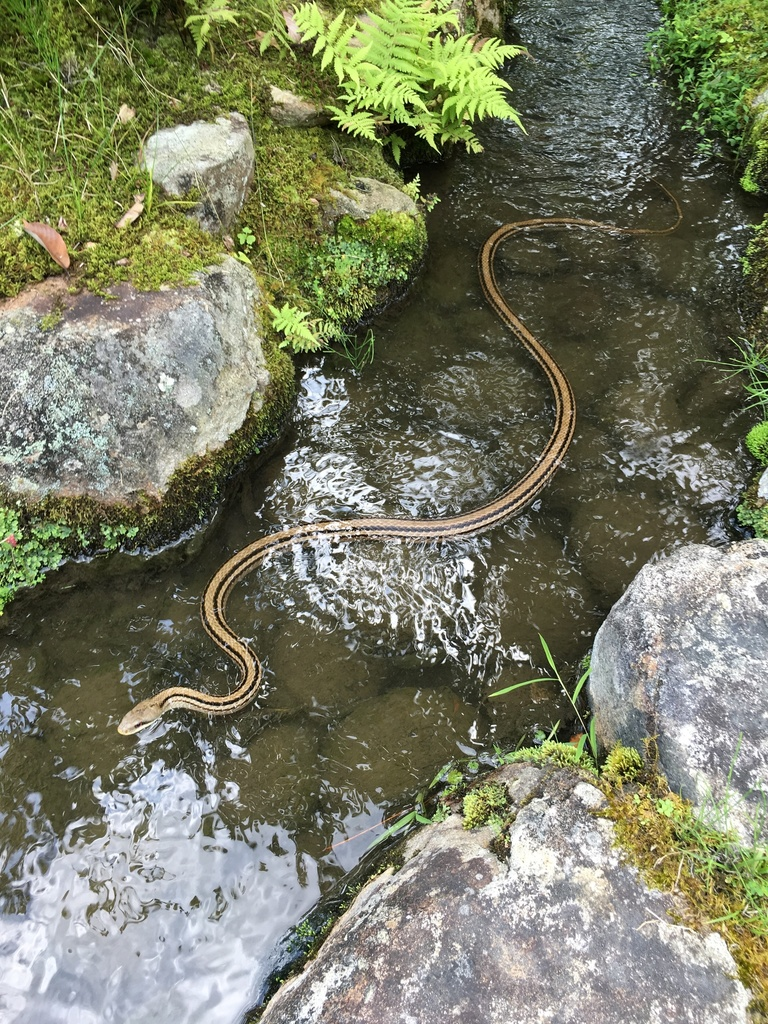
Swimming in a brook in Nara
