= Elaphe urartica =

Scientific classification
- Kingdom: Animalia
- Phylum: Chordata
- Class: Reptilia
- Order: Squamata
- Suborder: Serpentes
- Family: Colubridae
- Genus: Elaphe
- Species: E. urartica

Binomial name
- Elaphe urartica Jablonski, Kukushkin, Avcı, Bunyatova, Ilgaz, Tuniyev, & Jandzik, 2019

Species of snake

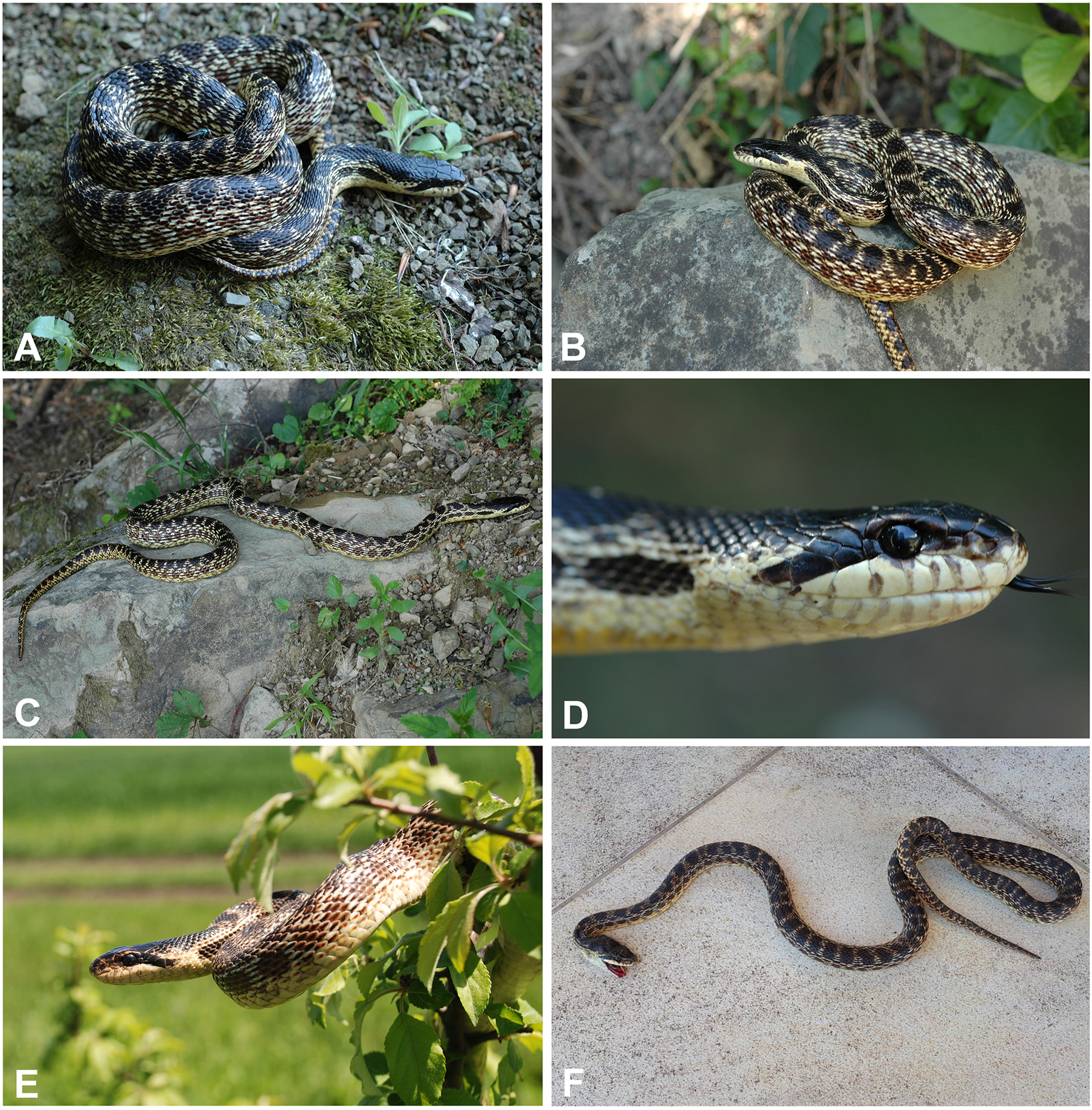
Color and pattern variation in Elaphe urartica. (A–D) Kaputan, Armenia; (E) Didi Shiraki, Georgia; (F) Ersi, Dagestan, Russian Federation

Elaphe urartica, the Urartian rat snake, is a species of non-venomous snake in the family Colubridae. The species is found in Turkey, Georgia, Armenia, Azerbaijan, Iran, and Russia.
