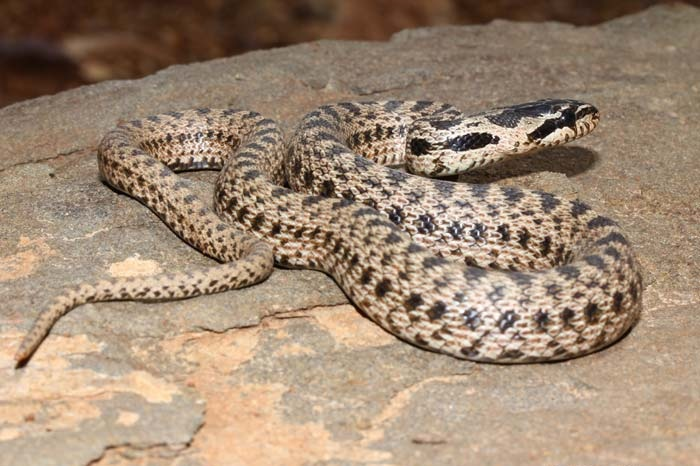

Conservation status
- Least Concern (IUCN 3.1)

Scientific classification
- Kingdom: Animalia
- Phylum: Chordata
- Class: Reptilia
- Order: Squamata
- Suborder: Serpentes
- Family: Colubridae
- Genus: Elaphe
- Species: E. sauromates

Binomial name
- Elaphe sauromates (Pallas, 1811)

= Blotched snake =

Elaphe sauromates

Species of snake

The blotched snake (Elaphe sauromates), a member of the Colubrinae subfamily of the family Colubridae, is a nonvenomous snake found in Eastern Europe. It grows up to 260 cm (8 ft 6 in) in length but the medium is 120 to 160 cm. It is one of the largest European snakes. The species has been of cultural and historical significance for its role in ancient Greek and Roman mythology and derived symbolism.

For symbolism of the blotched snake, see Serpent (symbolism).

== Description ==
The blotched snake is a large snake reaching a total body length of up to 2 m, however, in 1930, Constantin Kirițescu mentioned a 2.60 m specimen captured by Dombrovsky in 1901 at Cernavodă, which he personally studied. Some consider that this account takes inspiration from the local legends about giant snakes.

The ratio of the head and trunk length to tail length is 3.9 in males and 5.1 in females. The width of the body is 5–6 cm. The head is weakly separated from the neck. The eye is medium in size with a round pupil. The maxillary teeth are of equal length.

The blotched snake has 25 dorsal scales (rarely 23 or 27). The lateral scales are smooth. The ventral scales number 187–224 in males and 205–234 in females. They have 56-90 subcaudals. In most cases the anal plate is divided.

Each scale has a dark brown spot on a yellowish-white or pinkish-white background. The dark brown pigment predominates. The color of the back varies – adults usually have a tan or reddish-brown dorsal coloration, and juveniles gray or yellowish-brown. On the back there are large, irregular (rhombic or oval), slightly elongated transversally, dark spots. These spots are disposed in 4 rows (4-5 rows in juveniles) longitudinally. On the ventral side is a row of smaller dark spots of the same color as the back which tend to form a continuous dark stripe.

Some scales on the sides of the body have a reddish or orange color. This type of pattern is noticeable in young specimens. The upper part of the head and nape in adults is uniformly dark brown or grey-brown.

== Geographic range ==
It is found in southeastern Europe (Albania, southeastern Romania, Republic of Moldova, southeastern Bulgaria, northeastern Greece, southern Ukraine, European Turkey), western Levant (Syria, Lebanon, Israel), southwestern Russia (Dagestan), Caucasus (Georgia, Armenia, Azerbaijan), southwestern Kazakhstan, northwestern Turkmenistan, and western Iran.

== Habitat ==
The blotched snake is found in steppes, semi-deserts, premontane and montane meadows, on rocky slopes covered with shrubs and in riparian forests. It can live up to 2500 m above sea level (in the Caucasus). It is often spotted near houses, in vineyards and orchards.

It finds shelter in the tunnels of gophers, gerbils and other small rodents, cracks of the soil and hollows of trees.
