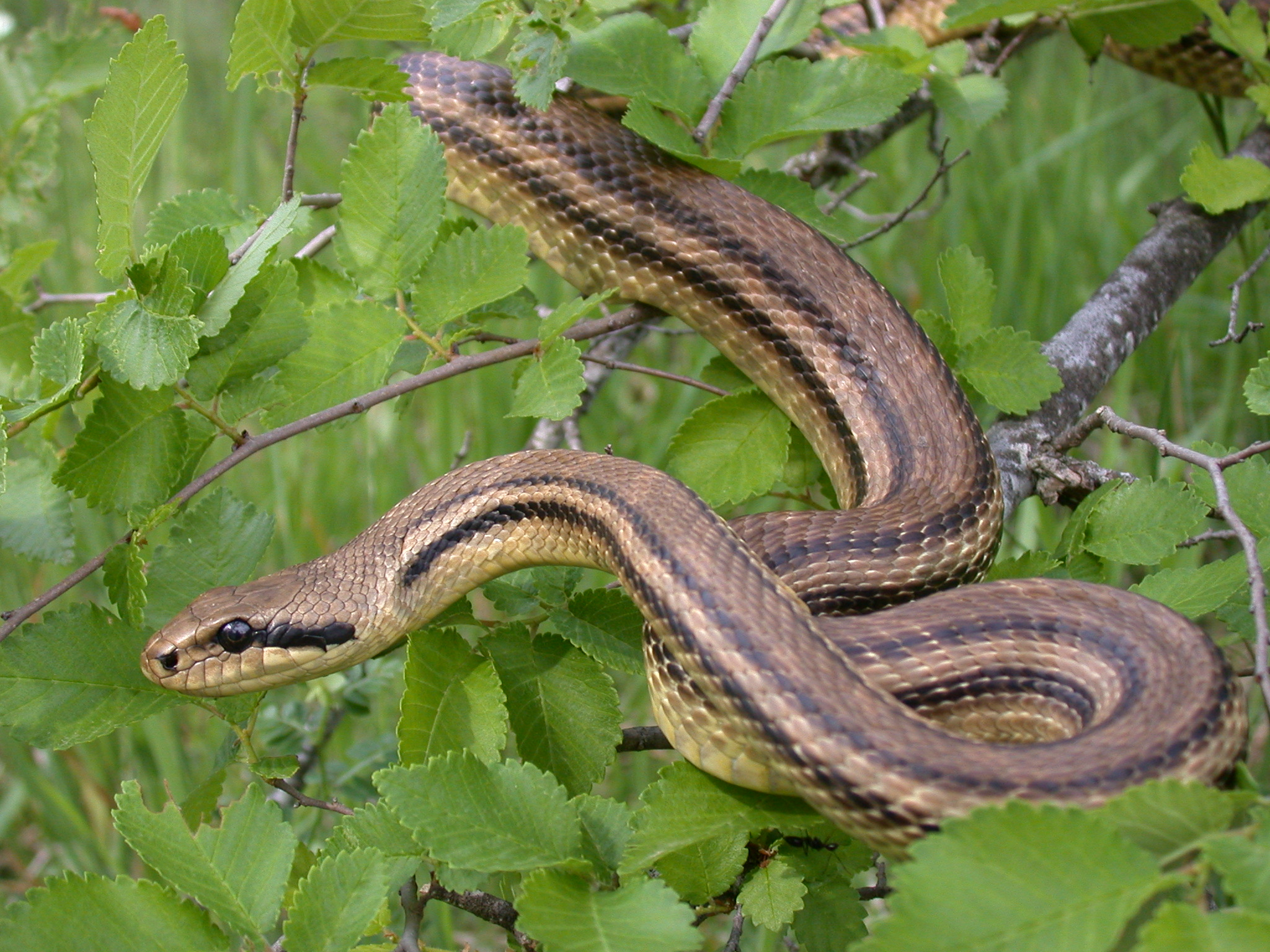

Conservation status
- Least Concern (IUCN 3.1)

Scientific classification
- Kingdom: Animalia
- Phylum: Chordata
- Class: Reptilia
- Order: Squamata
- Suborder: Serpentes
- Family: Colubridae
- Genus: Elaphe
- Species: E. quatuorlineata

Binomial name
- Elaphe quatuorlineata (Lacépède, 1789)
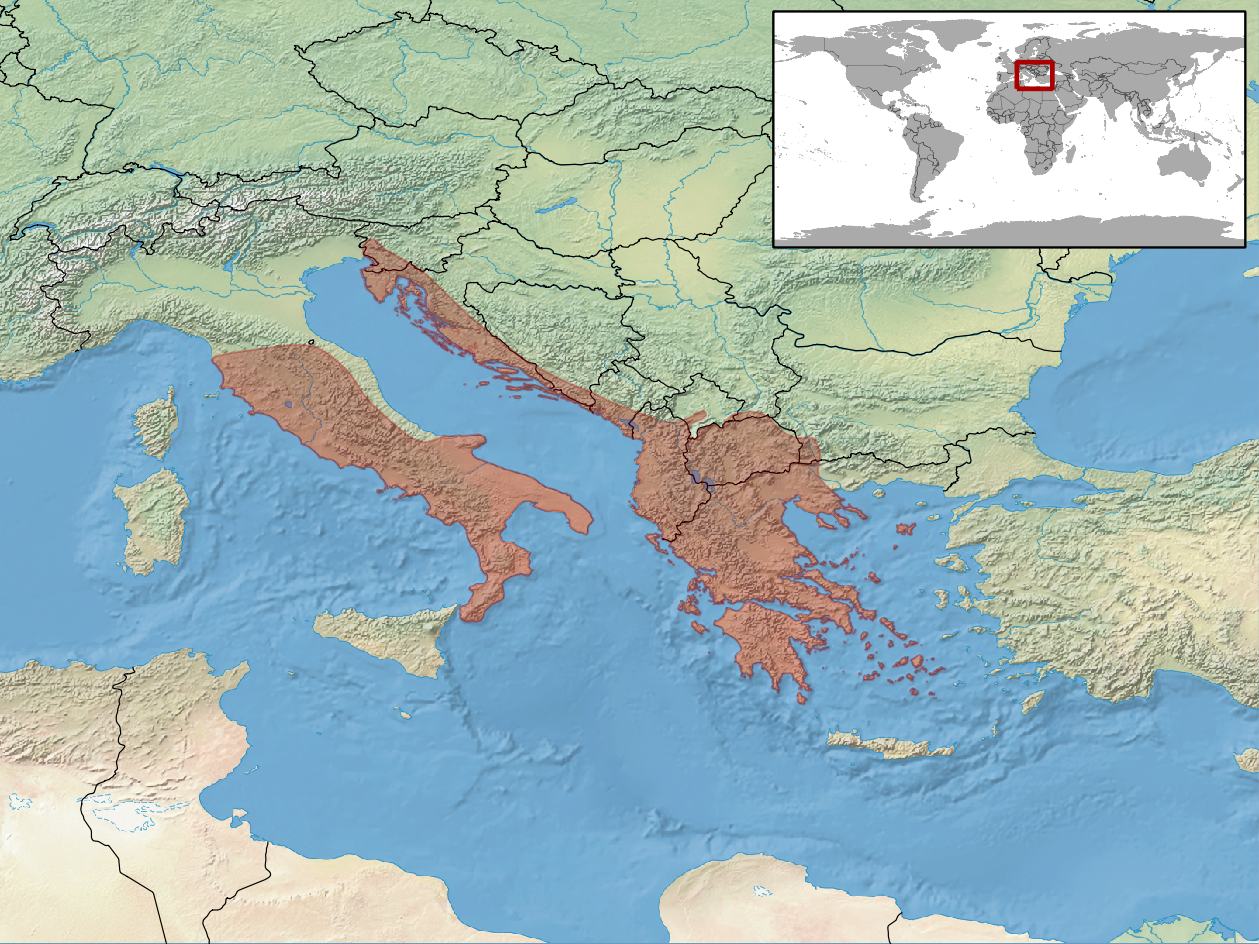

Synonyms
- Coluber quatuorlineatus Lacépède, 1789; Elaphis quadrilineatus — Bonaparte, 1839; Elaphis quaterradiatus — A.M.C. Duméril & Bibron, 1854

= Four-lined snake =

Species of snake

Elaphe quatuorlineata (common names: four-lined snake, Bulgarian ratsnake) is a member of the family Colubridae. The four-lined snake is a non-venomous species and one of the largest of the European snakes.

== Description ==
The species' common name refers to the markings seen on the body of adult snakes: four dark stripes running along a yellowish brown body. Juveniles, by contrast, have a dorsal series of dark brown blotches with alternating dark brown spots on the sides, all on a pale brown background. A black line runs from the corner of the eye and the belly is cream to white with darker markings. Adults can reach a length of 180 cm (5 ft 11 in), rarely 200 cm (6 ft 7 in). Adults are among the heaviest European snakes but are greatly variably in size, with males potentially weighing from 250 to 1,000 g (0.6 to 2.2 lb) and females potentially weighing from 400 to 1,400 g (0.9 to 3.1 lb) within the Aegean Islands.

== Distribution ==
Four-lined snakes are found in Italy, along the whole western coast of the Balkan Peninsula, in the western half of Greece and many of the Greek islands, the region of Macedonia, the southwestern corner of Bulgaria, coastal Slovenia, coastal Croatia, Bosnia and Herzegovina, Montenegro, North Macedonia and Albania. The number of snakes and the density of the populations are unknown.

== Habitat and behavior ==
The four-lined snake favours areas with a Mediterranean climate and is found in habitats featuring vegetation, stone walls, sparse woodland, forest margins and deserted buildings. In the winter, individuals spend their time in deserted rodent burrows in groups of four to seven. Their behaviour is generally calmer than that of other snakes (seldom hissing or striking) and they are usually active in the morning and late afternoon. Excellent climbers, they can often be found in the tops of trees.

== Diet ==
A large proportion of the snakes' diet consists of small mammals, such as rabbits, weasels, squirrels, and mice. They also feed on birds, lizards, newly hatched tortoises and eggs. Females of the species have been shown to feed more often upon birds than do males.

== Reproduction ==
The mating season lasts from April to May. Females have a gestation period that lasts about two months, the eggs being laid in summer. Females typically lay around 6–18 eggs and incubate them for about 40–60 days.

== Conservation ==
The four-lined snake has been considered endangered in Bulgaria due to poachers and agriculture. It appears on the IUCN Red List of Threatened Species as "Near Threatened" because of probable significant decline in its abundance and widespread habitat loss.
