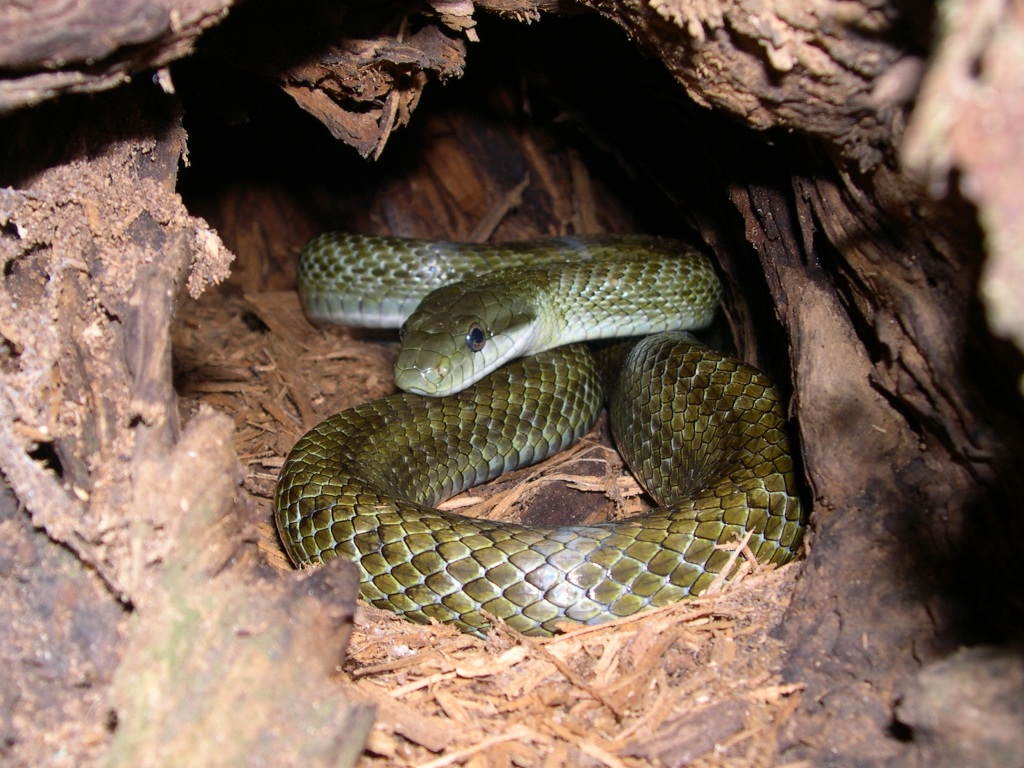
- Japanese rat snake, E. climacophora

Scientific classification
- Kingdom: Animalia
- Phylum: Chordata
- Class: Reptilia
- Order: Squamata
- Suborder: Serpentes
- Family: Colubridae
- Subfamily: Colubrinae
- Genus: Elaphe; Wagler, 1833

Synonyms
- Callopeltis, Elaphis, Scotophis

= Elaphe =

Genus of rat snakes

Elaphe is a genus of snakes in the family Colubridae. Elaphe is one of the main genera of the rat snakes, which are found in many regions of the northern hemisphere. Elaphe species are medium to large constrictors by nature.

Based on the mitochondrial DNA analysis results, many species formerly in Elaphe have been moved to the genera Bogertophis, Coelognathus, Gonyosoma, Orthriophis, Pantherophis, Rhinechis, Senticolis, Zamenis, and others. Nevertheless, the generic name Elaphe is still widely used both for the species remaining in Elaphe and to refer broadly to members of the several Columbid genera formerly included in Elaphe.

== Physical characteristics ==
Like most of the rat snakes, Elaphe species (spp.) generally have slender but sturdy bodies, square heads, and extremely flat bellies. Their sizes range from large medium to very large, growing even as large as 2.75m (108 in). Elaphe spp. have large numbers of vertebrae, ribs, and ventral scales, but few rows of dorsal scales, which are characterized by having slight keels. In cross section, Elaphe spp. are shaped like a loaf of bread, the flat belly meeting the sides of the body at an angle. This special physical characteristic is well observed in Elaphe obsoleta (now considered Pantherophis obsoletus), whose belly scales curve upward. The curving of the ventral scales gives them better traction for tree climbing. The color and pattern of Elaphe spp. are quite variable and hard to generalize.

Internally, Elaphe spp. do not have any observable vestiges of hind limbs or coronoid bones of the lower jaw like any other members of the family Colubridae. Another important characteristic of Elaphe as part of the Colubridae is the presence of Duvernoy's gland, a modified salivary and digestive gland. In addition, Elaphe spp. have equal and smooth maxillary teeth. The teeth are small and slightly curved, and occur in several rows. The curved teeth help fix the prey and prevent them from escaping once they are caught.

== Senses ==
Elaphe spp. have very developed sensory organs which support their daily activities. They have internal ears that enables them to detect sounds at low frequencies. The ears consist of a single ear bone connected to a jaw bone. Compared to other snakes, they are considered to have highly developed vision that allows them to detect the movement of their predators and prey. The eyes are protected by single transparent brilles. In addition, the analysis of scents is carried out by Jacobson's organ in the palate. To stimulate Jacobson's organ, they use their tongues to transport air and ground molecules to Jacobson's organ. Then, the organ analyzes the molecules to identify the scent. Among these detectable scents are pheromones, which indicate the presence of other snakes and their reproductive readiness.

== Lifecycle and behavior ==
The lifespan of Elaphe spp. is generally 15 years. Males live a little longer than females, but some species, such as E. guttata (now considered Pantherophis guttatus), live up to 23 years in captivity. However, species such as E emoryi (now considered Pantherophis emoryi) usually have lifespans around 2 years and 2 months.

Elaphe spp. generally reach sexual maturity after 18–24 months. They usually mate with the opposite sex after emerging from hibernation in the spring. The gestation period of females is around 1.5 months, and females can lay up to 30 eggs in a clutch; but clutch size varies between species (See the reproduction subsection). E. guttata and E. obsoleta, among others, are mostly diurnal, but some species are more active in late afternoon or at dusk. Throughout the year, they are usually active from April to October, followed by a period of hibernation.

=== Hibernation ===
Elaphe species hibernate, especially those that live in cold regions, because snakes are cold-blooded, which makes their body temperature susceptible to the temperature of their environments. Thus, they need to maintain their body energy by switching locations and remaining physiologically inactive when winter comes. The hibernacula sites vary depending on the habitats they live in, yet the most important requirement of a hibernaculum site is that it needs to be frost-free. Some Elaphe spp. hibernate in the rock crevices, rock faults, and burrows.

However, other species choose to hibernate in rotting logs, roots of trees, and hollow spaces in elevated tree trunks. Some snakes that live close to human communities even hibernate in old wells and barns.

Most of the genus Elaphe spp. start their hibernation in October and emerge again the next spring. The length of the hibernation varies by species. Elaphe longissima, or Aesculapian snake, may hibernate from October to May, as it is among the northernmost occurring rat snakes. However, Elaphe bimaculata, or the twin-spotted rat snake, only needs to hibernate for 2 to 3 months. Species such as black rat snakes, or E. obsoleta, hibernate with other rat snakes and/or many other snake species, most notably timber rattlesnakes, racers, and bull snakes.

=== Reproduction ===
E. obsoleta generally starts to mate in late April, May, and early June after the winter hibernation. Males try to attract females with pheromones, as the females pass through their territories. Male Aesculapian snakes pursue female snakes until they can coil around them. They continue in such position, which is then followed by dancing for up to an hour before copulation, during which the male snake lines up with the female and holds her in place by wrapping his tail around hers and grasping her with his mouth. Then, the male everts one of his hemipenes into the female's cloaca. The mating process lasts from a few minutes to a few hours.

After copulation, Elaphe spp. seek an appropriate place to lay the developing eggs. They usually lay eggs in the soft heart of a rotten log or in sandy soil under a rock. A good place for laying eggs is one that is damp but not wet, and warm but not hot. After laying eggs, the female snake covers them up with sand or soil, and then she leaves. A few species remain with the eggs until they hatch about 9 weeks later.

Oviparous E. obsoleta lays 12–20 eggs under logs or leaves in late summer, which hatch in the fall. The adult snakes return to their hibernation dens in the late fall. E. guttata breeds from March to May. The mating process is similar to E. obsoleta. E. guttata lays 10–30 eggs in late May to July. The eggs are generally not protected by the adults. After 60–65 days, the eggs hatch in July through September.

=== Defense mechanisms ===
Many Elaphe spp. are known for being nonaggressive and shy. They are prone to freeze their movements when they are shocked or encountering danger. This motionless response has contributed to many road kills of Elaphe. However, some Elaphe spp. tend to be more defensive if they are continually provoked. For example, Texas rat snakes, Elaphe obsoleta lindheimeri, are well known as one of the most snappy and combative rat snakes. In general, their defense system can be broken down to two levels. The first line of defense involves specific behaviors that they use to warn the intruders. One of the most common ways is by coiling their bodies and vibrating their tails, which simulates a rattle. Fox snakes, Elaphe vulpina (now considered Pantherophis vulpinus) and Elaphe gloydi (now considered Pantherophis gloydi), exemplify this type of defense mechanism; they mimic the rattling vibration of rattlesnakes when they encounter danger. Another common way of defense is by smearing a foul-smelling musk on their predators. The musk is originated from the contents of the anal gland and the intestinal tract. The second line of defense, generally involves striking the intruder with their teeth if they are further provoked.

== Locomotion ==
Elaphe spp. move forward using side-to-side, serpentine movement. They use the curved ventral scales of their bodies to grab the rough ground surfaces and then push against the ground to generate a forward movement. Thus, the smoother the ground is, the harder it is for them to move across it. Many species apply similar mechanisms when climbing trees.

== Predation ==
Adult Elaphe spp. primarily prey on rodents (i.e., mice, chipmunks, and juvenile rats), bird eggs, and young birds. Juveniles feed on small lizards, young mice, and occasionally small frogs (i.e., tree frogs). Elaphe spp. hunt by waiting motionless in a fixed position until the prey comes near enough to attack. Then, they strike the prey and bite it. They use their Jacobson's organ to track and find their prey. Being constrictors, Elaphe spp. kill the prey by creating enormous pressure on the prey's chest. As they continue to coil more tightly, the pressure on the chest prevents the blood from circulating into the heart, which eventually leads to heart failure. They usually bite the prey first to maintain their grip on the prey before they start this deadly mechanism. In addition, they do not chew their food, but swallow it whole.

== Habitat and distribution ==
Elaphe spp. live in a great variety of environments, depending on species and subspecies. Most are terrestrial or semiarboreal, but some burrow in sand or loose soil. The genus formerly contained species found on every continent except Antarctica. Taxonomic revisions have renamed most of these former Elaphe, leaving only 10 Eurasian taxa remaining in Elaphe.

== Species ==
The following 18 species are recognized as being valid.

- Elaphe anomala (Boulenger, 1916) – Korean rat snake, southern Amur rat snake
- Elaphe bimaculata Schmidt, 1925 – Chinese leopard snake
- Elaphe cantoris (Boulenger, 1894) – eastern trinket snake
- Elaphe carinata (Günther, 1864) – Taiwan stink snake
- Elaphe climacophora (H. Boie, 1826) – Japanese rat snake
- Elaphe davidi (Sauvage, 1884) – Pere David's rat snake
- Elaphe dione (Pallas, 1773) – steppe rat snake
- Elaphe druzei Jablonski, Ribeiro-Júnior & Meiri, 2023 – Levant rat snake
- Elaphe hodgsoni (Günther, 1860) – Himalayan trinket snake, Hodgson's rat snake
- Elaphe moellendorffi (Boettger, 1886) – flower snake, Moellendorf’s rat snake, Moellendorff's trinket snake
- Elaphe quadrivirgata (H. Boie, 1826) – Japanese four-lined rat snake
- Elaphe quatuorlineata (Lacépède, 1789) – four-lined snake
- Elaphe sauromates (Pallas, 1811) – blotched rat snake, Sarmatian rat snake, eastern four-lined rat snake
- Elaphe schrenckii Strauch, 1873 – Amur rat snake, Siberian rat snake
- Elaphe taeniura (Cope, 1861) – beauty snake, Taiwan beauty snake; Sakishima beauty snake; blue beauty rat snake
- Elaphe urartica Jablonski, Kukushkin, Avcı, Bunyatova, Ilgaz, Tuniyev & Jandzik, 2019 – Urartian rat snake
- Elaphe xiphodonta Qi, Shi, Ma, Gao, Bu, Grismer, Li & Wang, 2021 – Qin Emperor rat snake, blade-toothed rat snake
- Elaphe zoigeensis S. Huang, Ding, Burbrink, Yang, J. Huang, Ling, Chen & Zhang, 2012 – Zoige rat snake
