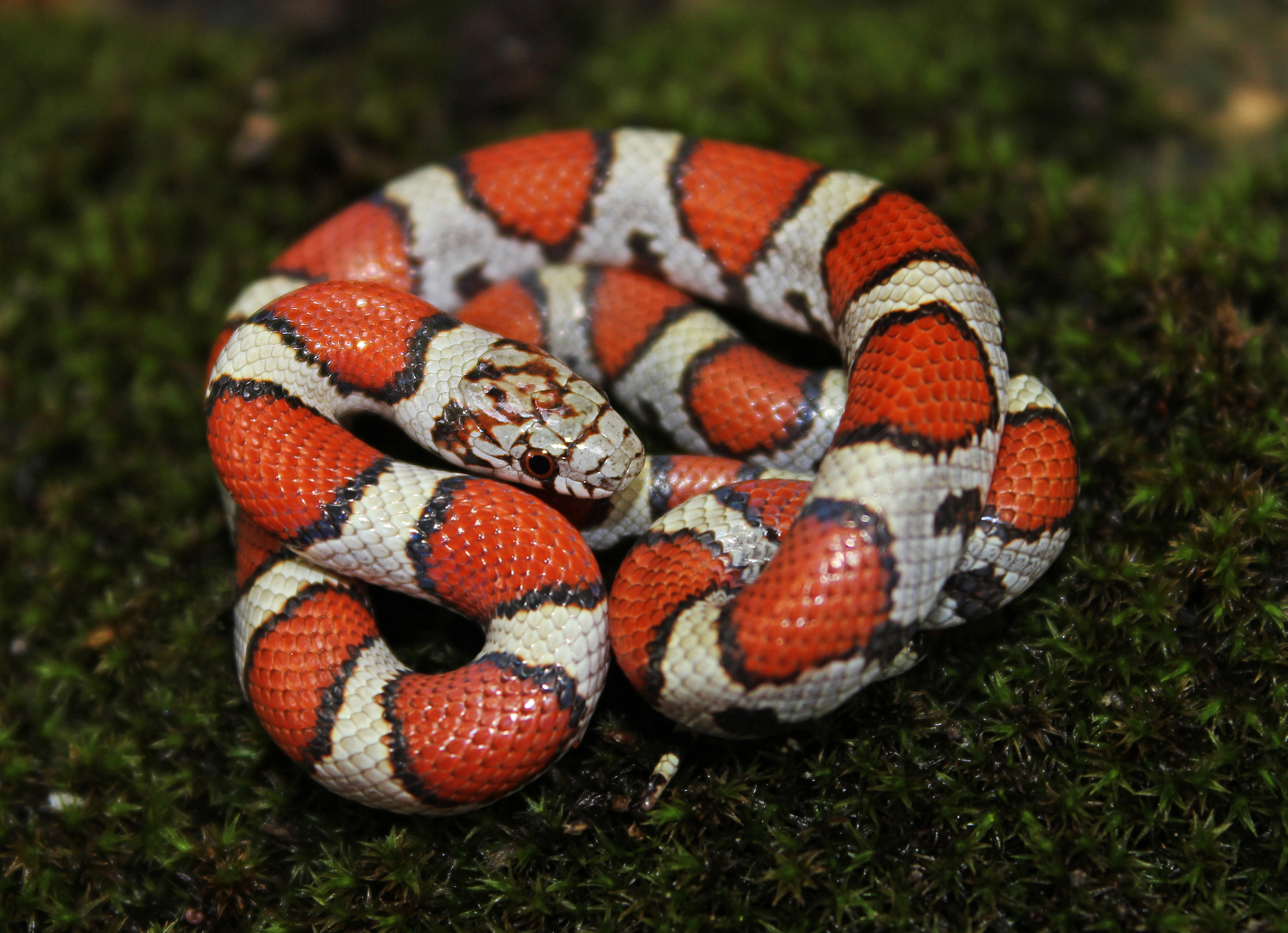
- Milk snake, Lampropeltis triangulum

Scientific classification
- Kingdom: Animalia
- Phylum: Chordata
- Class: Reptilia
- Order: Squamata
- Suborder: Serpentes
- Family: Colubridae
- Subfamily: Colubrinae
- Tribe: Lampropeltini; Dowling, 1975

Genera
- Senticolis Dowling & Fries, 1987; Pantherophis Fitzinger, 1843; Pituophis Holbrook, 1842; Bogertophis Dowling & Price, 1988; Rhinocheilus Baird & Girard, 1853; Pseudelaphe Mertens & Rosenberg, 1943; Arizona Kennicott, 1859; Cemophora Cope, 1860; Lampropeltis Fitzinger, 1843

= Lampropeltini =

Lampropeltini Temporal range: Early Miocene – present, 23–0 Ma

Tribe of snakes

Lampropeltini is a tribe of colubrid snake endemic to the New World. These include the kingsnakes, milk snake, corn snake, gopher snakes, pine snakes, and bullsnakes. At least 51 species have been recognized and the group have been heavily studied for biogeography, morphology, ecology, and phylogenetics.

== Taxonomy ==
The internal relationships among the genera has been disputed, but generally the most supported placement of the genera are as follows:

- The basal placement of Senticolis
- The sister relationship between Pantherophis and Pituophis, with at least one study in 2016 suggesting the former genus is paraphyletic in respect to the latter
- The sister relationship between Cemophora and Lampropeltis
- A clade consisting of genera of Rhinocheilus, Pseudelaphe, and Arizona

Pyron and Burbink (2009) phylogeny of the tribe using 31 species using 7 loci (1 nDNA and 6 mtDNA), as well as incorporating the fossil record:

- Lampropeltini
  - Senticolis
  - - - Pituophis
      - Pantherophis
    - - - Bogertophis
        - Pseudelaphe
      - - - Rhinocheilus
          - Arizona
        - - Cemophora
          - Lampropeltis

Lampropeltini section from Pryon et al. (2013) in their large scale squamate phylogeny using 4,161 species on 12,896 base pairs from 12 loci (7 nDNA and 5 mtDNA):

- Lampropeltini
  - Senticolis
  - - - Pituophis
      - Pantherophis
    - - Bogertophis
      - - - Rhinocheilus
          - - Arizona
            - Pseudelaphe
        - - Cemophora
          - Lampropeltis

Lampropeltini section from Figueroa et al. (2016) in their large scale snake phylogeny using 1,745 species on 9,523 base pairs from 10 loci (5 nDNA and 5 mtDNA):

- Lampropeltini
  - Senticolis
  - - - - Rhinocheilus
        - - Arizona
          - Pseudelaphe
      - - Pantherophis (=Scotophis)
        - - Pantherophis sensu stricto
          - Pituophis
    - - Bogertophis
      - - Cemophora
        - Lampropeltis

Dahn et al. (2018) use 20 out of the 51 known species using 14 loci:

- Lampropeltini
  - Senticolis
  - - - Pituophis
      - Pantherophis
    - - - Bogertophis
        - Pseudelaphe
      - - - Arizona
          - - Rhinocheilus
            - - Cemophora
              - Lampropeltis

== Description ==
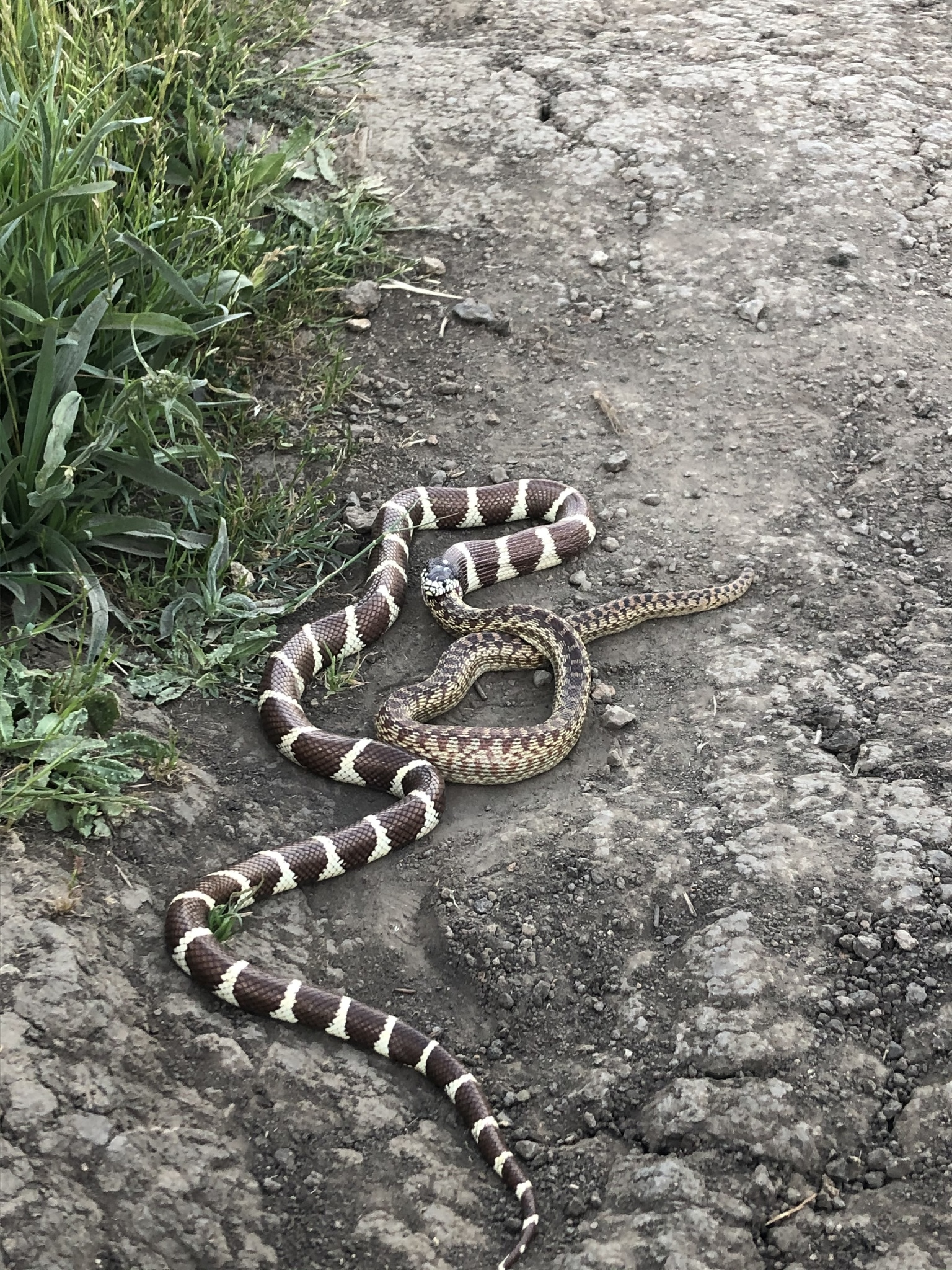
California kingsnake (Lampropeltis californiae) eating a gopher snake (Pituophis catenifer)

Some species are among the longest species (Pantherophis obsoletus) and largest species (Pituophis catenifer) in North America. A lot of species also have evolved to predate and consume other species of snakes, most notably among the species in the genus Lampropeltis. All species kill their prey through constriction. Many species are in captivity such as kingsnakes and corn snakes.
