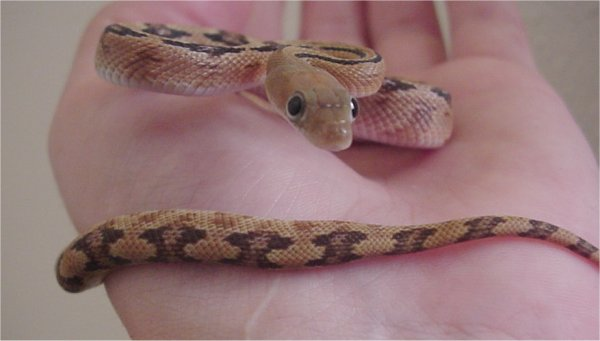
- Juvenile Trans-Pecos rat snake Bogertophis subocularis

Scientific classification
- Kingdom: Animalia
- Phylum: Chordata
- Class: Reptilia
- Order: Squamata
- Suborder: Serpentes
- Family: Colubridae
- Tribe: Lampropeltini
- Genus: Bogertophis; Dowling & R. Price, 1988

Species
- Bogertophis rosaliae Bogertophis subocularis
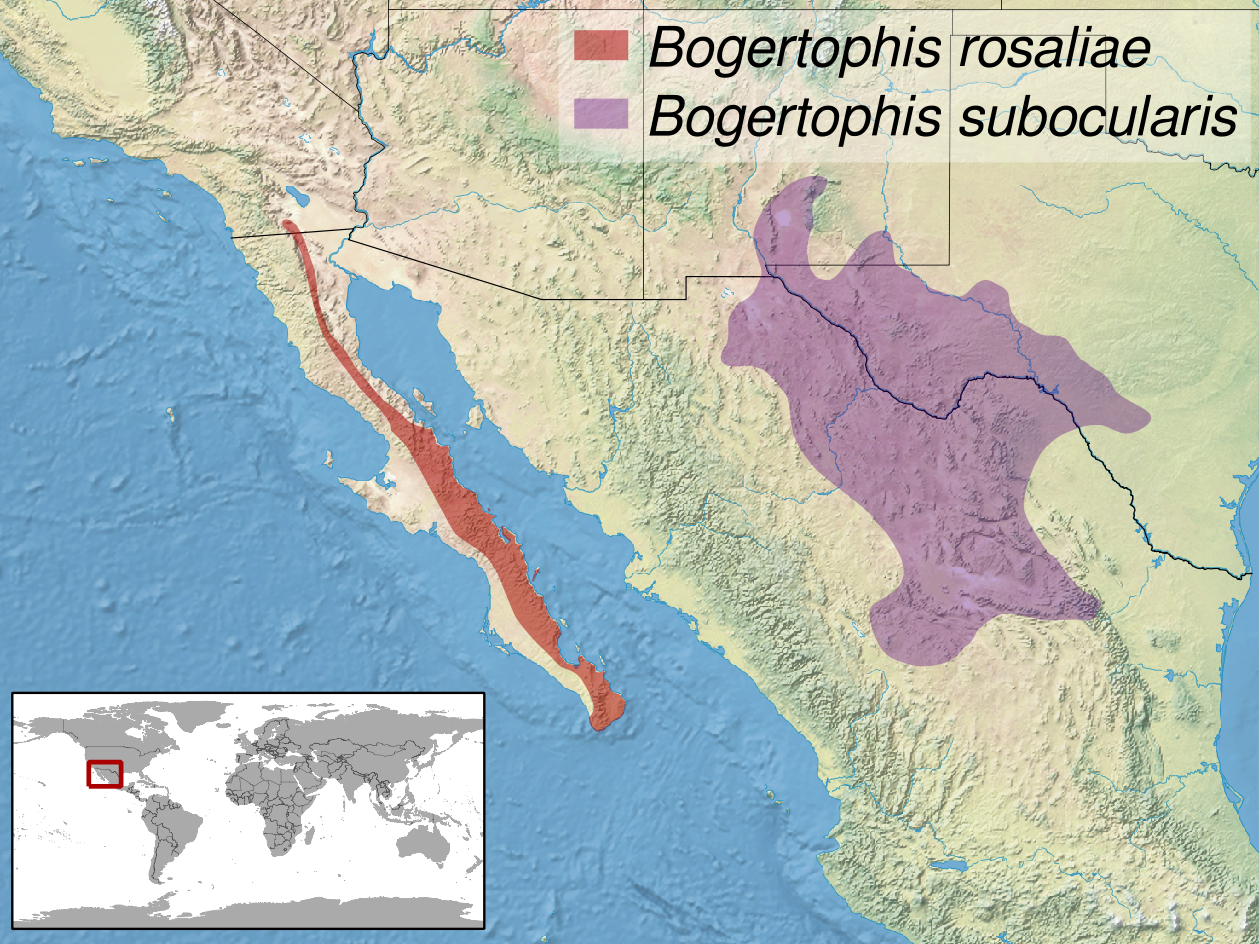

= Bogertophis =

Genus of snakes

Bogertophis is a genus of New World rat snakes in the family Colubridae. The genus is endemic to the southwestern United States and northern Mexico. There are two accepted species.

== Etymology ==
The genus Bogertophis is named in honor of American herpetologist Charles Mitchill Bogert.

== Species ==
The following two species are recognized as being valid.

| Image | Scientific name | Common name | Distribution |
|---|---|---|---|
| | Bogertophis rosaliae (Mocquard, 1899) | Baja California rat snake | Mexico (Baja California) and southern California |
| | Bogertophis subocularis (A. Brown, 1901) | Trans-Pecos rat snake | Mexico (Chihuahua, Coahuila, Durango, and Nuevo León) and the United States (Texas and New Mexico) |

Nota bene: A binomial authority in parentheses indicates that the species was originally described in a genus other than Bogertophis.

== Description ==
Bogertophis are long, slender snakes, with large eyes that have round pupils. They can attain total lengths (including tail) of 1.68 m (5.5 ft).

B. rosaliae is more variable in color, found in shades of tan, red, orange, or brown.

B. subocularis is almost universally tan in color with interconnected black blotches on the back and two black stripes down the neck. There is an isolated locality of B. subocularis where it is found with a light yellow coloration that is termed a "blonde" variant, and there is also an almost white coloration, that is sometimes referred to as the "silver" variant.

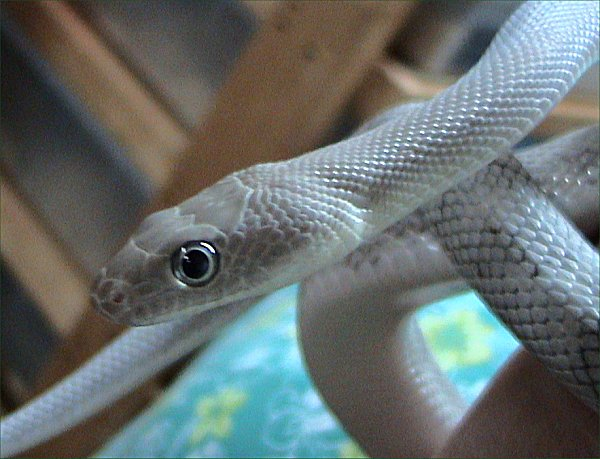
Trans-Pecos rat snake, Bogertophis subocularis, demonstrating the "silver" variant

== Behavior and diet ==
Bogertophis are typically nocturnal snakes that feed on a wide variety of rodents, bats and sometimes lizards, especially when younger. They are found in semi-arid habitats; so they spend much of their time hiding from the heat of the day.

== Reproduction ==
Bogertophis species are oviparous.

== In captivity ==
Both Bogertophis species are commonly available in the exotic pet trade. Due to their typically docile nature and reliable feeding habits, they can make an excellent choice for a captive snake. They are also well represented in zoos.
