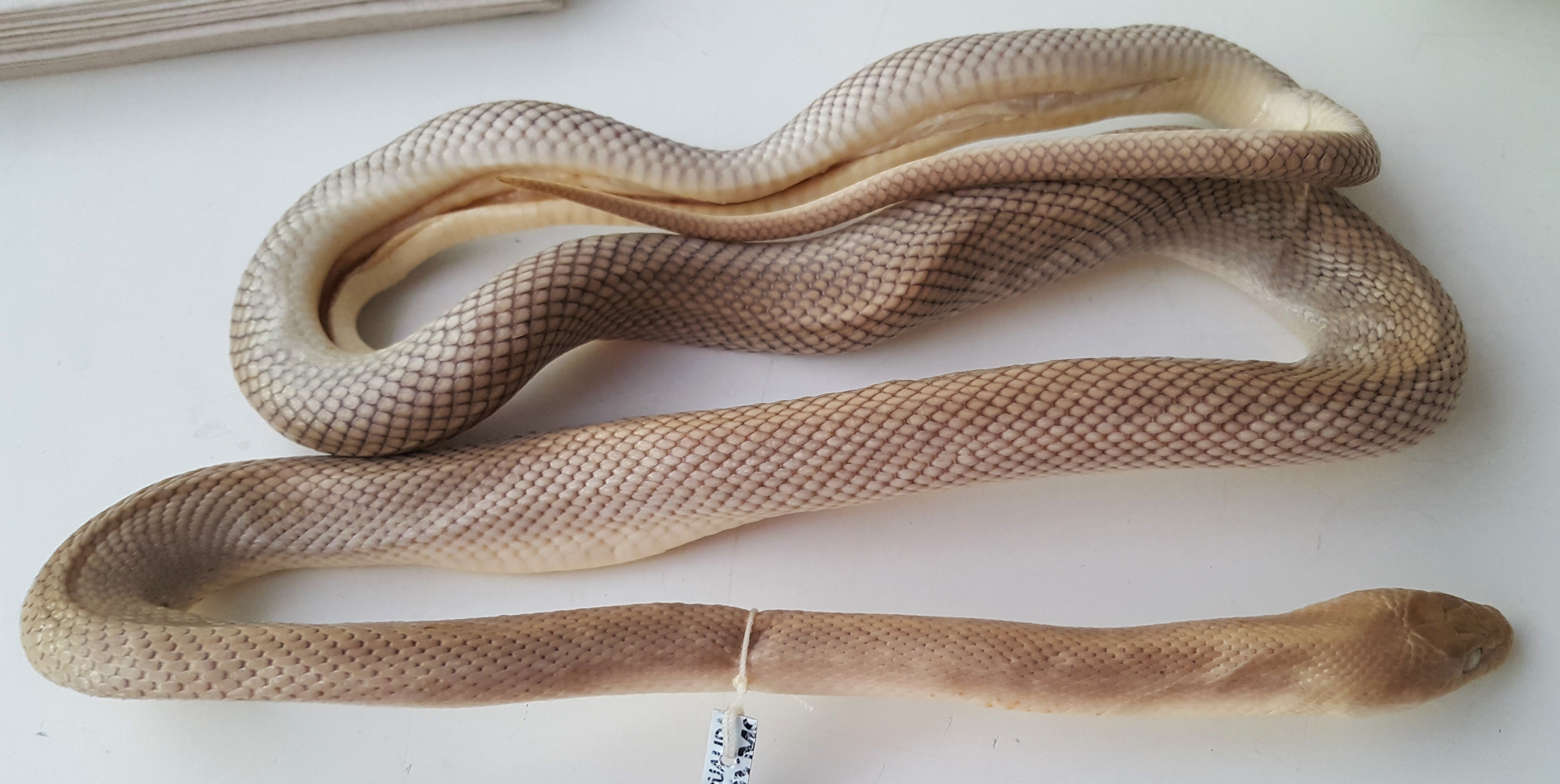

Conservation status
- Least Concern (IUCN 3.1)

Scientific classification
- Kingdom: Animalia
- Phylum: Chordata
- Class: Reptilia
- Order: Squamata
- Suborder: Serpentes
- Family: Colubridae
- Genus: Bogertophis
- Species: B. rosaliae

Binomial name
- Bogertophis rosaliae (Mocquard, 1899)
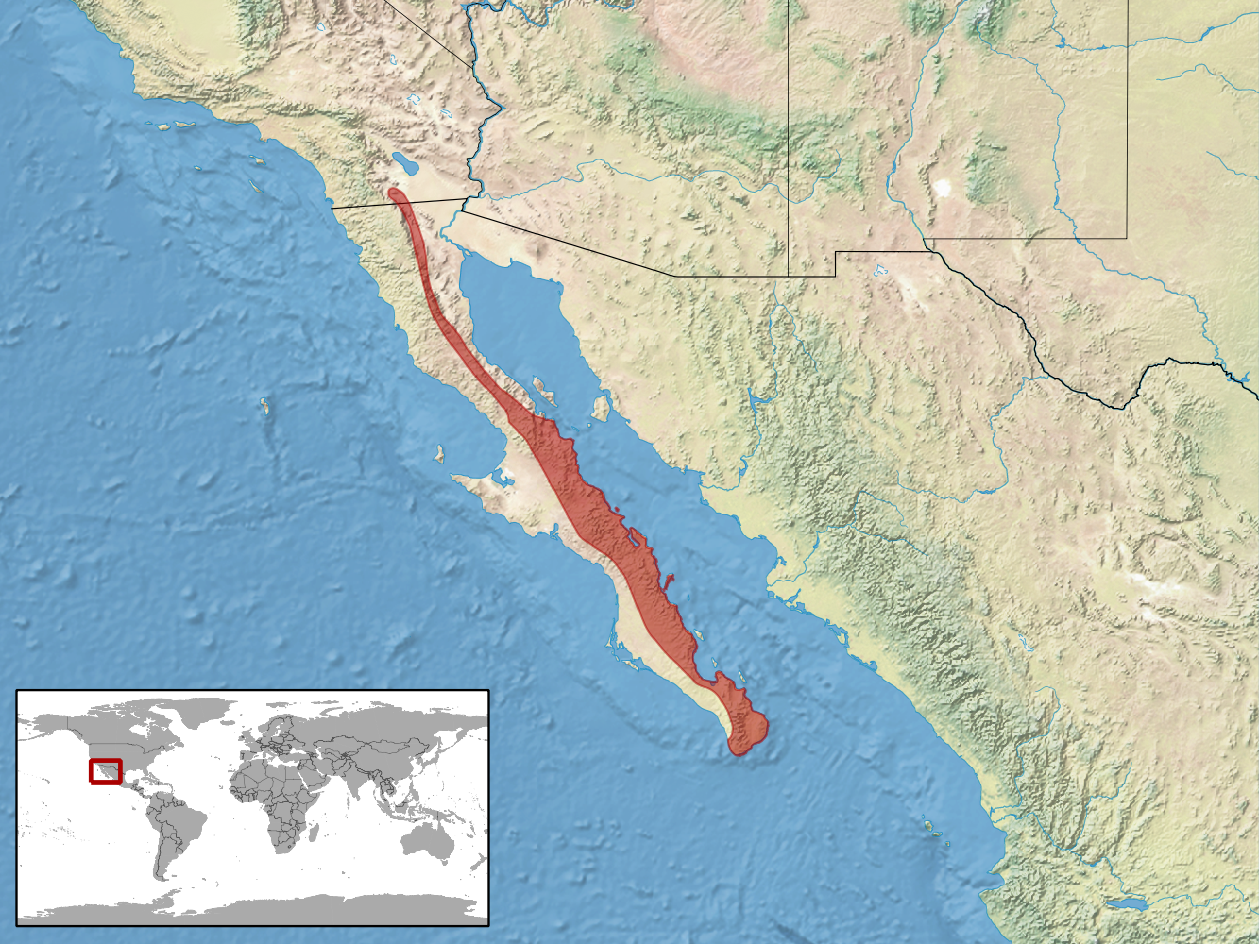

Synonyms
- Coluber rosaliae Mocquard, 1899; Elaphe rosaliae — Stejneger & Barbour, 1917; Bogertophis rosaliae — Dowling & Price, 1988; Elaphe rosaliae — Schulz, 1996; Bogertophis rosaliae — Crother, 2000

= Baja California rat snake =

Species of nonvenomous snake

The Baja California rat snake (Bogertophis rosaliae) is a species of nonvenomous snake in the family Colubridae. The species is native to Baja California, Mexico; extreme southern California; and some islands in the Sea of Cortés.

== Description ==
The Baja California rat snake is a large, slender colubrid snake with a long head, large eyes, and smooth dorsal scales. Adults have a total length (including tail) of 85–150 cm (33–59 in). Each dorsal scale contains two apical pits (Price 1990a, 1990b). The dorsum is uniform olive or reddish brown without dark markings on a cream-colored background (Ottley and Jacobsen 1983). Yellowish or greenish coloration extends from the lower sides of the body to the venter (Price 1990b). The iris is yellow-green (Ottley and Jacobsen 1983).

== Taxonomic remarks ==
Dowling and Price (1988) placed this snake in its own genus, Bogertophis, based on immunological data, but complications with the data set and the mode of analysis indicated that it was best to regard this species as a member of the rat snake genus, Elaphe, until further data became available (L. Grismer and John Wright, pers. comm.). No attempts have been made to characterize genetic variation across the geographic range of B. rosaliae. An understanding of that variation is needed to determine whether genetically differentiated populations exist within B. rosaliae. The difficulty in obtaining the requisite material for such a study makes it likely that novel techniques, such as extracting DNA from preserved specimens, will be needed to address this problem.

== Geographic range ==
The Baja California rat snake ranges from extreme southern Imperial County, California, southward into Baja California to Cabo San Lucas (Price 1990a). Over at least the northern half of its range, it is known from widely disjunctive locations (Ottley and Jacobsen 1983, Price 1990b). Its known elevations range from near sea level to ca. 300 m (980 ft). In the United States, B. rosaliae is known from only one road-killed specimen, CSDSNH 644161 taken 26 May 1984 on Interstate Highway 8, 3.84 km (2 mi) east of Mountain Spring (Imperial County), California. Although Stebbins (1985) and others believe this locality to be genuine (L. Grismer and G. Pregill, pers. comm.), some have questioned the validity of this record (S. Barry, J. Copp, and C. Fagan, pers. comm.).

== Life history ==
The life history of B. rosaliae is virtually unknown (Price 1990b). The species seems to be nocturnal or crepuscular and may be surface active during daylight hours under suitable conditions (Ottley and Jacobsen 1983). Nothing is known about reproduction or growth except that clutches with an unspecified number of eggs have been laid in captivity (Price 1990b). The few data on diet and behavior are based on captive specimens and are difficult to interpret in the absence of data on this snake under field conditions. If similar to other rat snakes, it climbs easily (Wright and Wright 1957) and adults are probably long-lived (see Bowler 1977). No data on movement, colonization abilities, or the potential predators of this taxon exist.

== Habitat ==
B. rosaliae is largely confined to mesic and dry desert habitats (rocky arroyos and washes) in the immediate vicinity of small springs (Ottley and Jacobsen 1983, Stebbins 1985) but individuals have also been observed on hillsides and dry mesas away from water sources (L. Grismer, pers. comm.). The habitat components critical to this snake have not been identified precisely, but it may require some kind of shrub or tree with a moderately dense crown in which to take refuge because it has been taken in native fan palms (Washingtonia spp.), date palms (Phoenix dactylifera), mesquite, palo blanco (Lysiloma candidum), palo verde, and creosote bush associations in the past (Price 1990b). The locations of oviposition sites are unknown.

== Status and habitat recommendations ==
The California State Government classes its status as "Special Concern". It notes that the snake is an infrequently observed species avidly sought after by amateur, scientific, and professional collectors alike. Because of the uncertain status of the single record from California, it believes that it should remain protected until further information regarding its distribution within the state becomes available.

The California Department of Fish and Game Habitat Conservation Planning Branch recommends that intensive surveys of habitats with shrubs or trees having a moderately significant crown in Imperial and San Diego counties are needed to determine whether this snake is really part of the herpetofauna of California. If populations are discovered, the Planning Branch states that the local habitat needs to be protected from modification and potential collecting, and some kind of monitoring for this taxon should be initiated.

== Sources ==
- Text in this article has been taken directly from the public domain source Amphibian and Reptile Species of Special Concern in California, Baja California Rat Snake. California Department of Fish and Game, 1994
