= Rhinocheilus antonii =

Scientific classification
- Kingdom: Animalia
- Phylum: Chordata
- Class: Reptilia
- Order: Squamata
- Suborder: Serpentes
- Family: Colubridae
- Genus: Rhinocheilus
- Species: R. antonii

Binomial name
- Rhinocheilus antonii Dugès, 1886

Species of snake

Rhinocheilus antonii, the Mexican long-nosed snake, is a species of snake of the family Colubridae.

The snake is found in Mexico.
