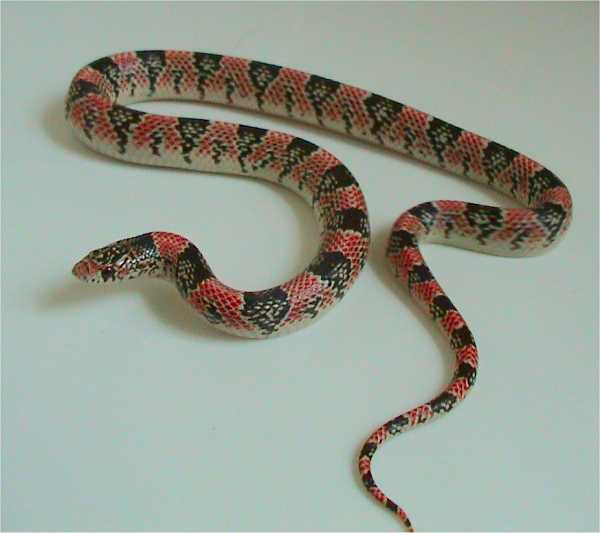
- Texas long-nosed snake

Scientific classification
- Kingdom: Animalia
- Phylum: Chordata
- Class: Reptilia
- Order: Squamata
- Suborder: Serpentes
- Family: Colubridae
- Genus: Rhinocheilus
- Species: R. lecontei
- Subspecies: R. l. tessellatus

Trinomial name
- Rhinocheilus lecontei tessellatus Garman, 1883

Synonyms
- Rhinochilus lecontii Var. tessellatus – Boulenger, 1894

= Rhinocheilus lecontei tessellatus =

Subspecies of snake

Common names: Texas long-nosed snake.

Rhinocheilus lecontei tessellatus is a subspecies of nonvenomous colubrid snake, which is native to the western United States and northern Mexico.

== Geographic range ==
R. l. tessellatus is found in the United States, primarily in Texas, but also in New Mexico, Oklahoma, Colorado, and Kansas, as well as in northern Mexico.

== Description ==
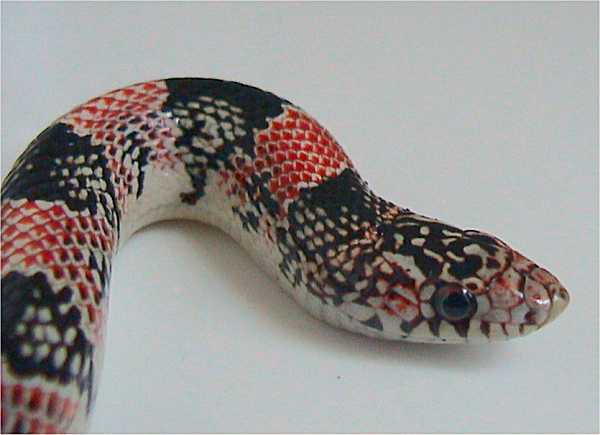

The Texas long-nosed snake is a tricolor subspecies. Its color pattern consists of a cream-colored or white body, overlaid with black blotches, with red between the black. This color pattern gives it an appearance vaguely similar to that of a venomous coral snake, Micrurus tener or Micruroides euryxanthus. It has an elongated snout, to which its common name refers. It may grow to approximately 30 inches (76 cm) in total length (including tail); record 41 inches (104 cm). In some western localities the red coloration can be greatly reduced, giving it a black and white banded appearance, and in other localities the red appears more orange or even pink in color. Rhinocheilus lecontei differs from all other harmless snakes in the United States by having undivided subcaudal plates.

Unlike other subspecies of R. lecontei, this subspecies, R. l. tessellatus, has a sharp snout with a distinct upward tilt, and the rostral scale is raised above the level of the adjacent scales.

== Behavior ==
The Texas long-nosed snake is a shy, nocturnal burrowing subspecies.

== Diet ==
R. l. tessellatus feeds on lizards and amphibians, sometimes smaller snakes and, infrequently, rodents.

== Reproduction ==
Rhinocheilus lecontei tessellatus is oviparous, laying clutches of 4-9 eggs in the early summer, which hatch out in the late summer, or early fall.

== Defense ==
The Texas long-nosed snake is not likely to bite; its primary defense is to release a foul smelling musk, or blood from the cloaca as a defense mechanism if harassed.

== Conservation status ==
This subspecies, R. l. tessellatus, holds no federal conservation status and no status through most of its range, but it is considered to be vulnerable in Kansas and Oklahoma, and critically endangered in Colorado. Primary threats are from habitat destruction.
