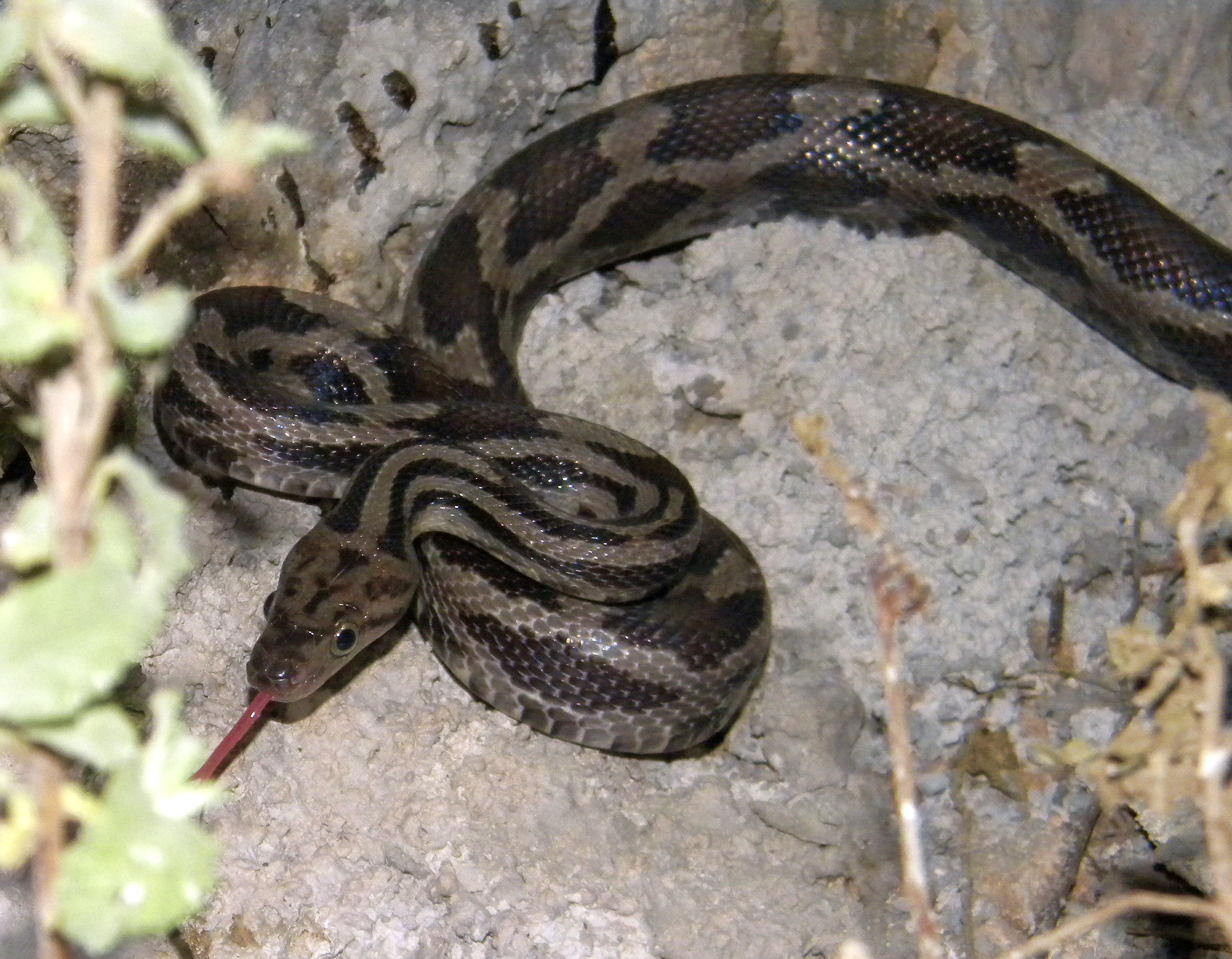

Conservation status
- Least Concern (IUCN 3.1)

Scientific classification
- Kingdom: Animalia
- Phylum: Chordata
- Class: Reptilia
- Order: Squamata
- Suborder: Serpentes
- Family: Colubridae
- Genus: Pseudelaphe
- Species: P. flavirufa

Binomial name
- Pseudelaphe flavirufa (Cope, 1867)

Synonyms
- Coluber flavirufus Cope, 1867; Natrix flavirufus — Cope, 1887; Elaphe flavirufa — Amaral, 1929; Pseudoelaphe flavirufus — Mertens & Rosenberg, 1943; Pseudelaphe flavirufus — Utiger et al., 2002; Pantherophis flavirufa — Utiger et al., 2002; Pseudelaphe flavirufa — Wallach et al., 2014

= Yellow-red rat snake =

Species of snake

The yellow-red rat snake (Pseudelaphe flavirufa) is a species of snake in the subfamily Colubrinae of the family Colubridae. The species is native to Mexico and Central America. Three subspecies are recognized.

== Geographic distribution ==
Pseudelaphe flavirufa is found in the Mexican states of Campeche, Chiapas, Oaxaca, Puebla, Querétaro, Quintana Roo, San Luis Potosí, Tamaulipas, and Zacatecas. It is also found in the countries Belize, Guatemala, Honduras, and Nicaragua.

== Habitat ==
The preferred natural habitat of Pseudelaphe flavirufa is forest.

== Description ==
Pseudelaphe flavirufa may attain a total length of 1.22 m (4.0 ft), which includes a tail 26 cm (10 in) long. Dorsally, it is yellowish or pale brown with a series of reddish or chestnut-brown spots, which are black-edged and may be confluent into a zigzag stripe. There is an alternating lateral series of smaller spots on each side of the dorsal series. Ventrally, it is yellowish, either plain or with small brown spots.

== Reproduction ==
Pseudelaphe flavirufa is oviparous.

== Subspecies ==
There are three subspecies of Pseudelaphe flavirufa, including the nominotypical subspecies, which are recognized as being valid.

- Pseudelaphe flavirufa flavirufa (Cope, 1867)
- Pseudelaphe flavirufa matudai (H.M. Smith, 1941)
- Pseudelaphe flavirufa pardalina (W. Peters, 1869)

Nota bene: A trinomial authority in parentheses indicates that the subspecies was originally described in a genus other than Pseudelaphe.

== Etymology ==
The subspecific name, matudai, is in honor of Japanese-Mexican botanist Eizi Matuda.
