= Rhinocheilus etheridgei =

Conservation status
- Data Deficient (IUCN 3.1)

Scientific classification
- Kingdom: Animalia
- Phylum: Chordata
- Class: Reptilia
- Order: Squamata
- Suborder: Serpentes
- Family: Colubridae
- Genus: Rhinocheilus
- Species: R. etheridgei

Binomial name
- Rhinocheilus etheridgei Grismer, 1990

Species of snake

Rhinocheilus etheridgei, Etheridge's longnose snake, is a species of snake of the family Colubridae.

The snake is found in Mexico.
