= Pseudelaphe phaescens =

Scientific classification
- Kingdom: Animalia
- Phylum: Chordata
- Class: Reptilia
- Order: Squamata
- Suborder: Serpentes
- Family: Colubridae
- Genus: Pseudelaphe
- Species: P. phaescens

Binomial name
- Pseudelaphe phaescens (Dowling, 1952)

Species of snake

Pseudelaphe phaescens, the Yucatán rat snake, is a species of snake of the family Colubridae.

The snake is found in Mexico.
