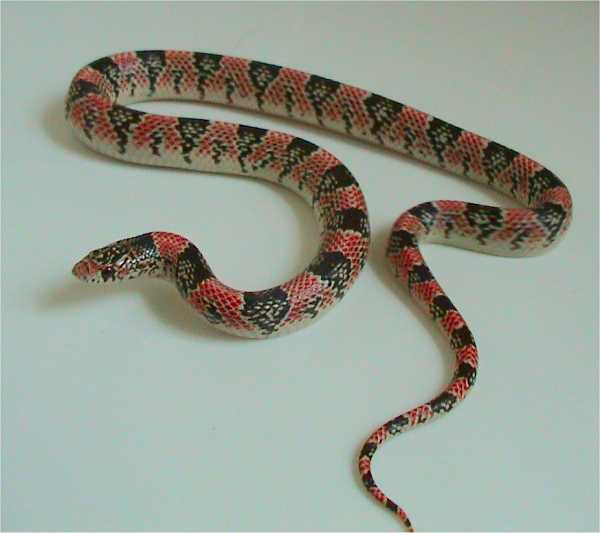
- Texas long-nosed snake Rhinocheilus lecontei tessellatus

Conservation status
- Least Concern (IUCN 3.1)

Scientific classification
- Kingdom: Animalia
- Phylum: Chordata
- Class: Reptilia
- Order: Squamata
- Suborder: Serpentes
- Family: Colubridae
- Genus: Rhinocheilus
- Species: R. lecontei

Binomial name
- Rhinocheilus lecontei Baird & Girard, 1853
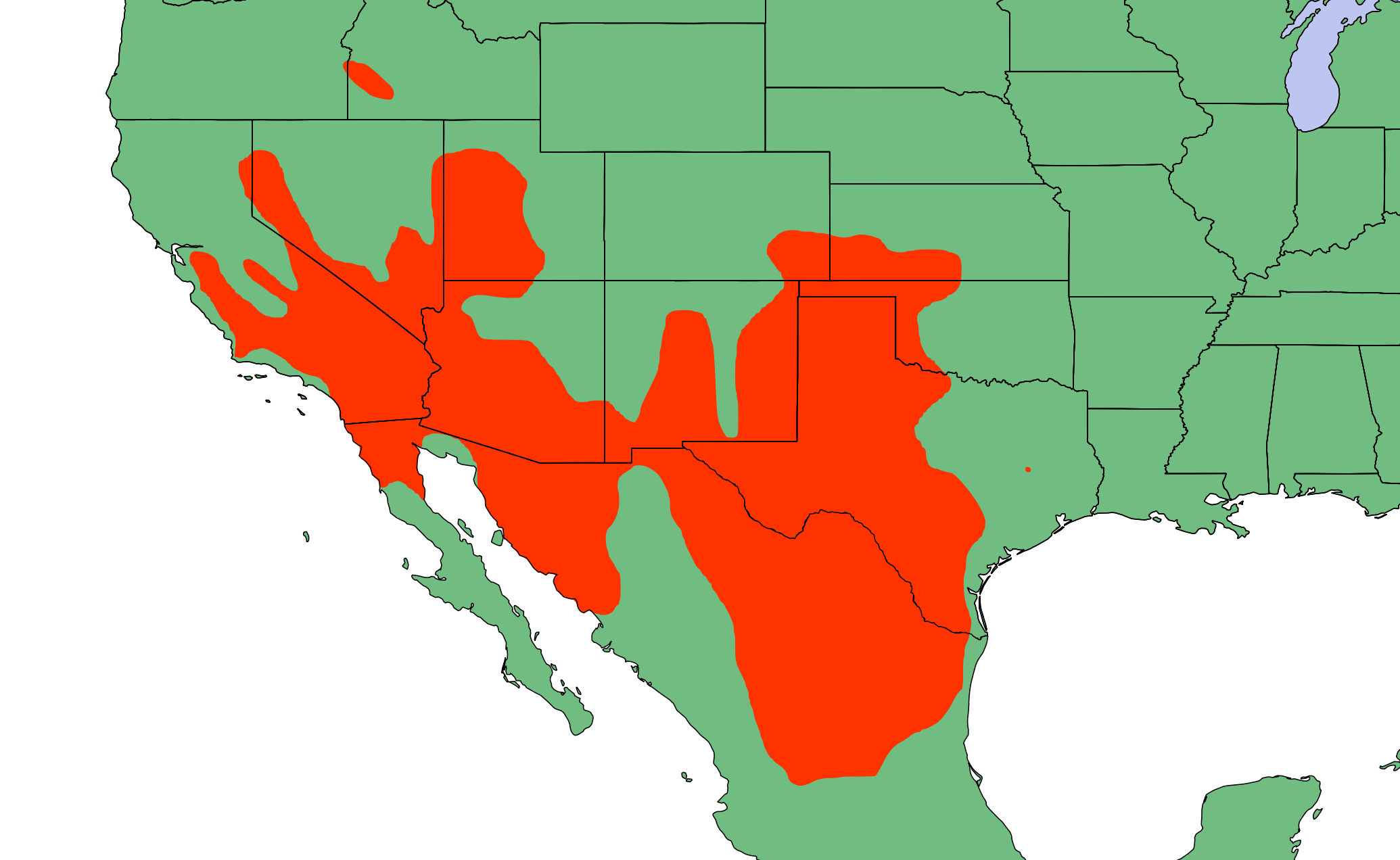

Synonyms
- Rhinocheilus lecontei Baird & Girard, 1853; Rhinochilus [sic] lecontei — Cope, 1866; Rhinochilus lecontii [sic] Boulenger, 1894; Rhinocheilus lecontei — Stejneger & Barbour, 1917

= Long-nosed snake =

Species of snake

The long-nosed snake (Rhinocheilus lecontei) is a species of nonvenomous snake in the family Colubridae. The species is endemic to North America. It has two recognized subspecies. The other species in the genus were previously considered subspecies.

== Etymology ==
The specific name, lecontei, commemorates American entomologist John Lawrence Le Conte (1825–1883).

== Description ==
The long-nosed snake is distinguished by a long, slightly upturned snout, which is the origin of its common name. It is tricolor, vaguely resembling a coral snake, with black and red saddling on a yellow or cream-colored background. Cream-colored spots within the black saddles are a distinct characteristic of the long-nosed snake. It differs from all other harmless snakes in the United States by having undivided subcaudal scales. The total length (including tail) of adults is usually 22–32 in (56–81 cm), but the maximum record total length is 41 in (100 cm).

== Behavior ==
R. lecontei is a shy, nocturnal burrowing snake. It spends most of its time buried underground.

== Diet ==
The long-nosed snake feeds on lizards, amphibians, and sometimes smaller snakes and infrequently rodents.

== Reproduction ==
R. lecontei is oviparous, laying clutches of 4-9 eggs in the early summer, which hatch in the late summer or early fall.

== Defense ==
The long-nosed snake is not apt to bite, but will release a foul smelling musk and blood from the cloaca as a defense mechanism if harassed.

== Habitat ==
The preferred natural habitats of the long-nosed snake are desert, grassland, shrubland, and savanna.

== Geographic range ==
R. lecontei is found in northern Mexico from San Luis Potosí to Chihuahua, and into the southwestern United States, in California, Nevada, Utah, Idaho, Arizona, New Mexico, southeastern Colorado, southwestern Kansas, Oklahoma, and Texas.

== Subspecies ==
- Western long-nosed snake, Rhinocheilus lecontei lecontei Baird & Girard, 1853
- Texas long-nosed snake, Rhinocheilus lecontei tessellatus Garman, 1883

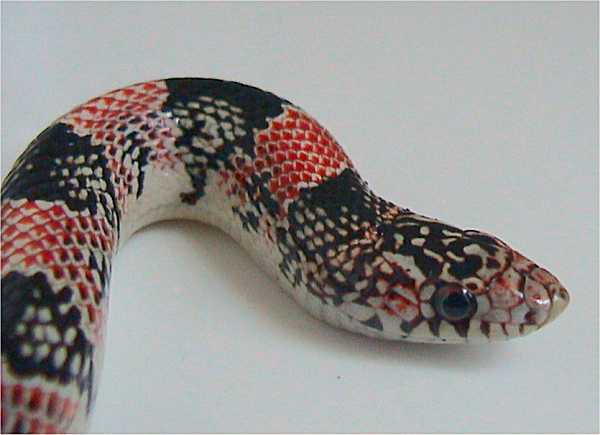
Texas long-nosed snake, Rhinocheilus lecontei tessellatus

== In captivity ==
The long-nosed snake is not often found in the exotic pet trade as it frequently rejects rodent-based diets that are most readily available for captive snakes.

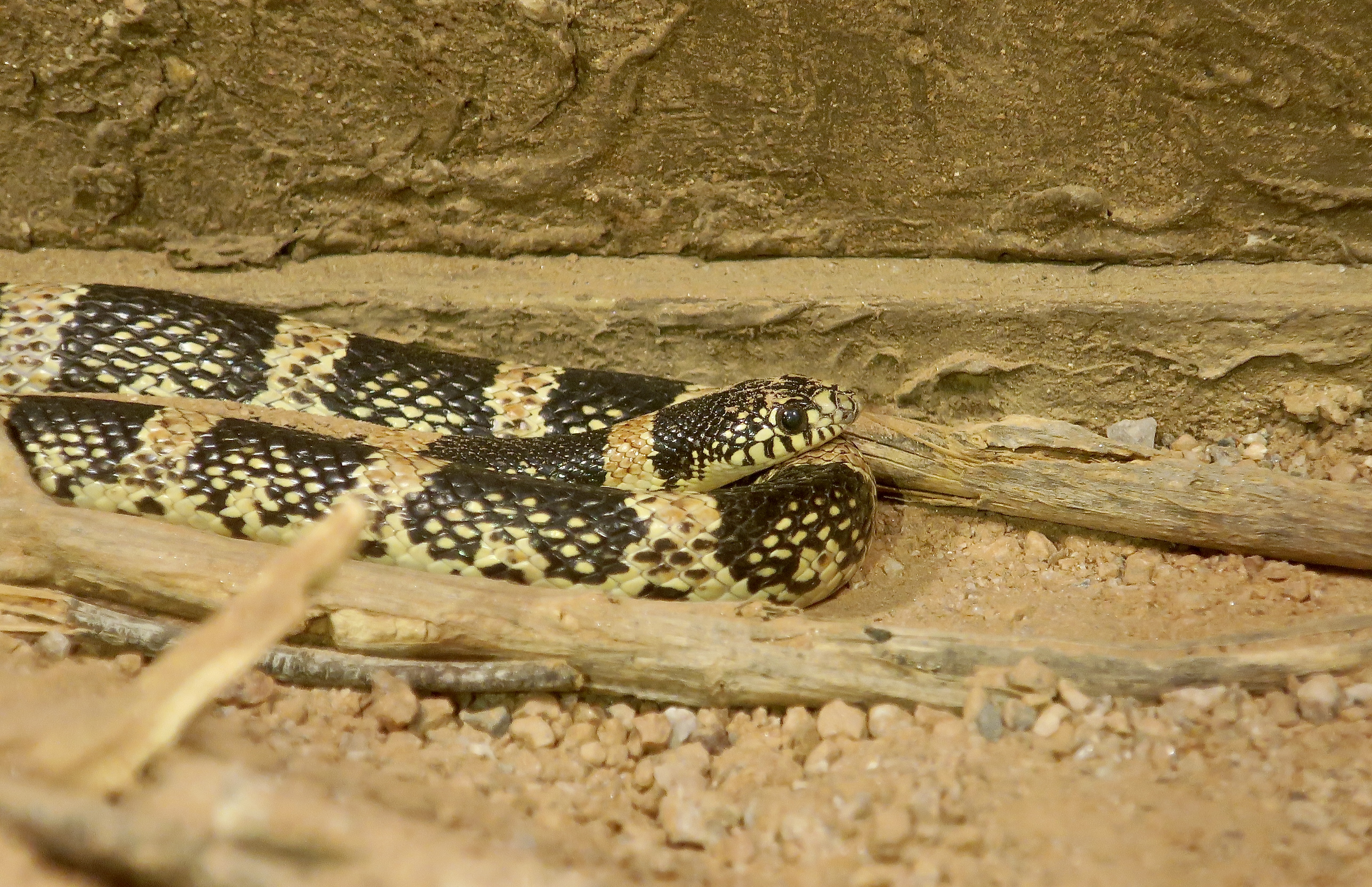
Western long-nosed snake (Rhinocheilus lecontei lecontei) at Phoenix Zoo.
