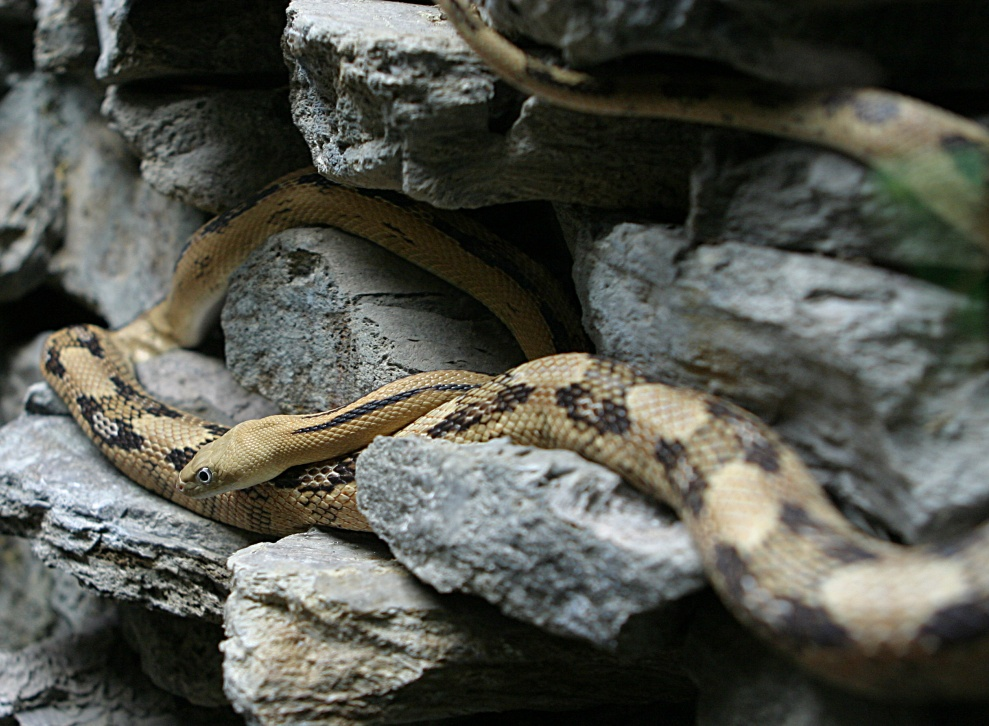
- A Trans-Pecos rat snake at the Houston Zoo

Conservation status
- Least Concern (IUCN 3.1)

Scientific classification
- Kingdom: Animalia
- Phylum: Chordata
- Class: Reptilia
- Order: Squamata
- Suborder: Serpentes
- Family: Colubridae
- Genus: Bogertophis
- Species: B. subocularis

Binomial name
- Bogertophis subocularis (A. Brown, 1901)
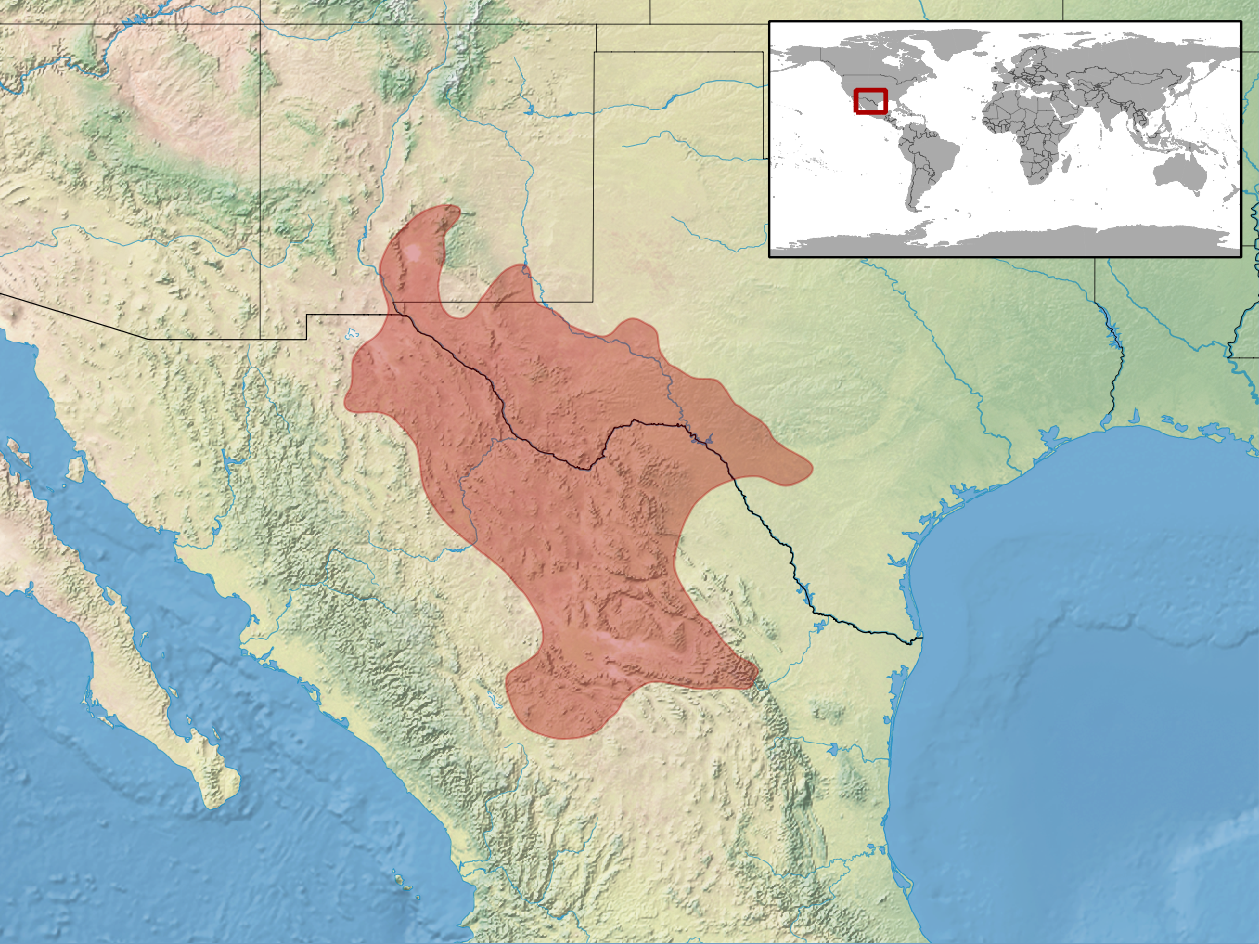

Synonyms
- Coluber subocularis A. Brown, 1901; Elaphe subocularis — Stejneger & Barbour, 1917; Elaphe subocularis — Reynolds & Scott, 1977; Bogertophis subocularis — Dowling & Price, 1988

= Trans-Pecos rat snake =

Species of snake

The Trans-Pecos rat snake or Davis Mountain rat snake (Bogertophis subocularis), is a species of medium to large, nonvenomous rat snake in the family Colubridae. Bogertophis subocularis is endemic to the Chihuahuan Desert.

== Geographic range ==
The Trans-Pecos rat snake is found in the Mexican states of Chihuahua, Coahuila, Durango, and Nuevo León, and its range extends northward into Texas and New Mexico in the United States.

== Description ==
B. subocularis has a row of small scales (suboculars) between the lower border of the eye and the upper labials. Coloration is yellow to tan dorsally with a series of black, or dark brown, H-shaped markings. The eye is large and prominent, light-colored with a contrasting round black pupil. The tongue is pink. The dorsal scales are in 31-35 rows at midbody. The ventrals number 260-277; the subcaudals number 69-79.

Adults are usually 36-54 inches (90–137 cm) in total length (including tail). The record total length is 66 inches (168 cm).

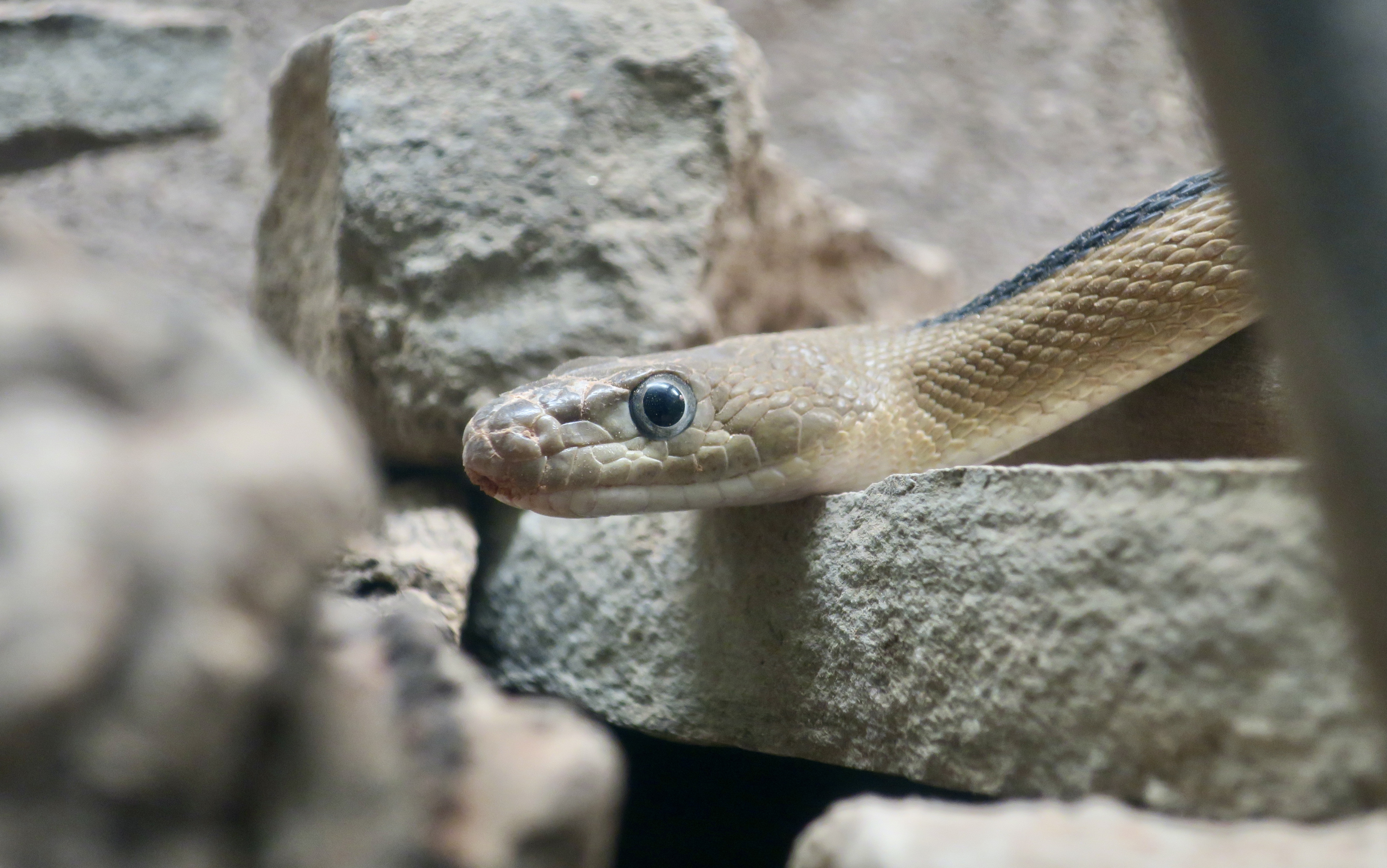
Closeup of an individual at Wildlife World Zoo.

== Habitat ==
The Trans-Pecos rat snake's habitat consists of desert flats and brushy slopes, and rocky outcrops where it dens.

== Diet ==
B. subocularis feeds on small vertebrates.

== Behavior ==
A nocturnal species, B. subocularis is uncommon and rarely seen in the wild, save on warm summer nights during the breeding season. Nicknamed "suboc" by enthusiasts, it is nonaggressive when approached, even passive, and is easily raised in captivity.

== Sexual dimorphism ==
B. subocularis exhibits sexual dimorphism. Females are larger than males as adults. Adult males reach between 3.5 and 4.5 feet (1.1-1.4 m) in total length (including tail); whereas females grow up to 5.5 feet (1.7 m).

== Reproduction ==
The breeding season for B. subocularis runs through May and June, while egg-laying begins in July and ends by September. At nearly three months, their incubation period is lengthy for a snake, at the end of which a clutch of anywhere from three to 11 snakes, each 28–33 cm (11–13 in) in total length, hatch. As they are hatched during winter, the hatchlings may remain hidden underground for several months before venturing outside.
