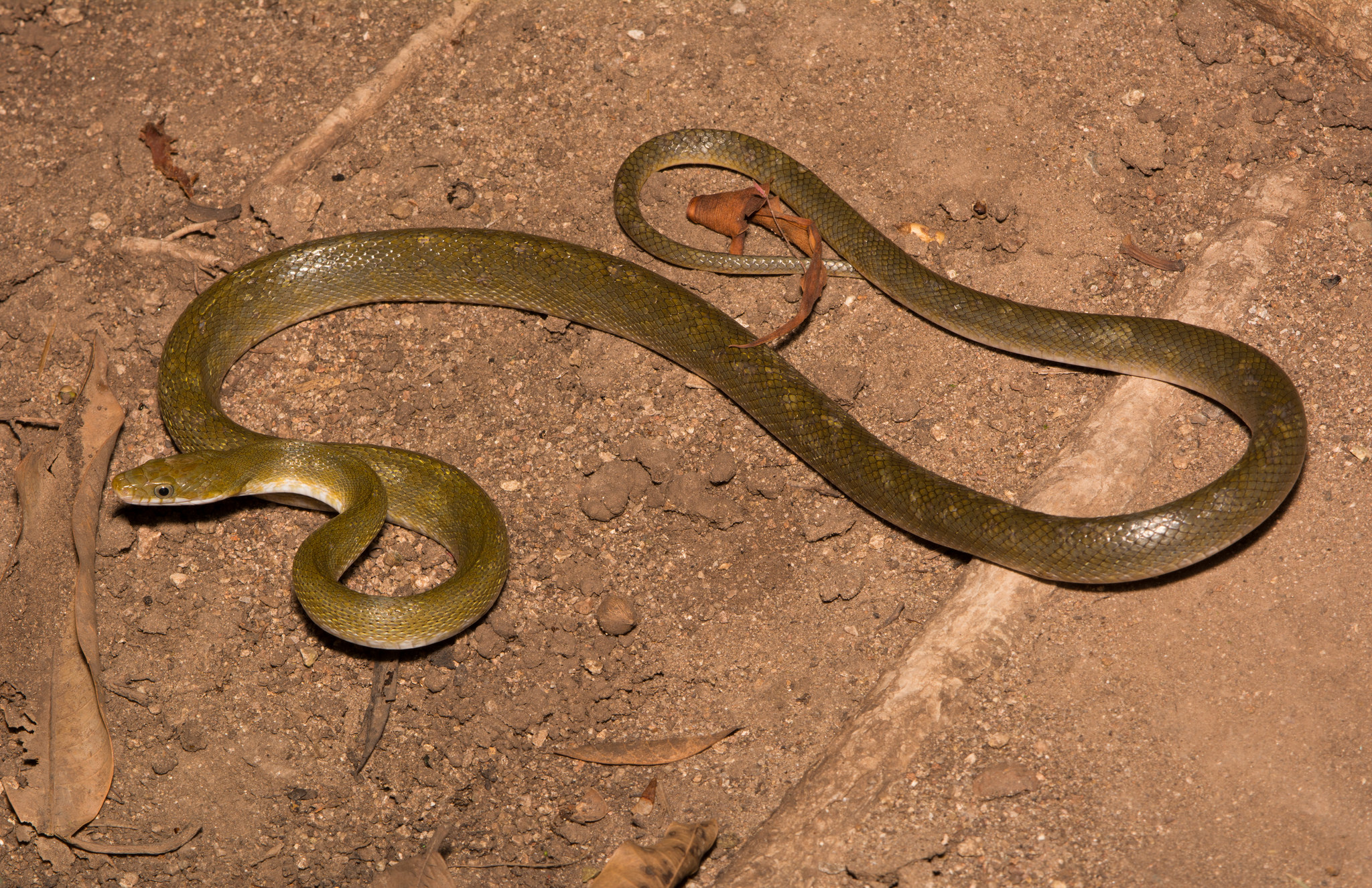
- Northern green ratsnake (Senticolis triaspis intermedia) from Sonora, México

Conservation status
- Least Concern (IUCN 3.1)

Scientific classification
- Kingdom: Animalia
- Phylum: Chordata
- Class: Reptilia
- Order: Squamata
- Suborder: Serpentes
- Family: Colubridae
- Genus: Senticolis; Dowling & Fries, 1987
- Species: S. triaspis

Binomial name
- Senticolis triaspis (Cope, 1866)

Subspecies
- Three, see text.
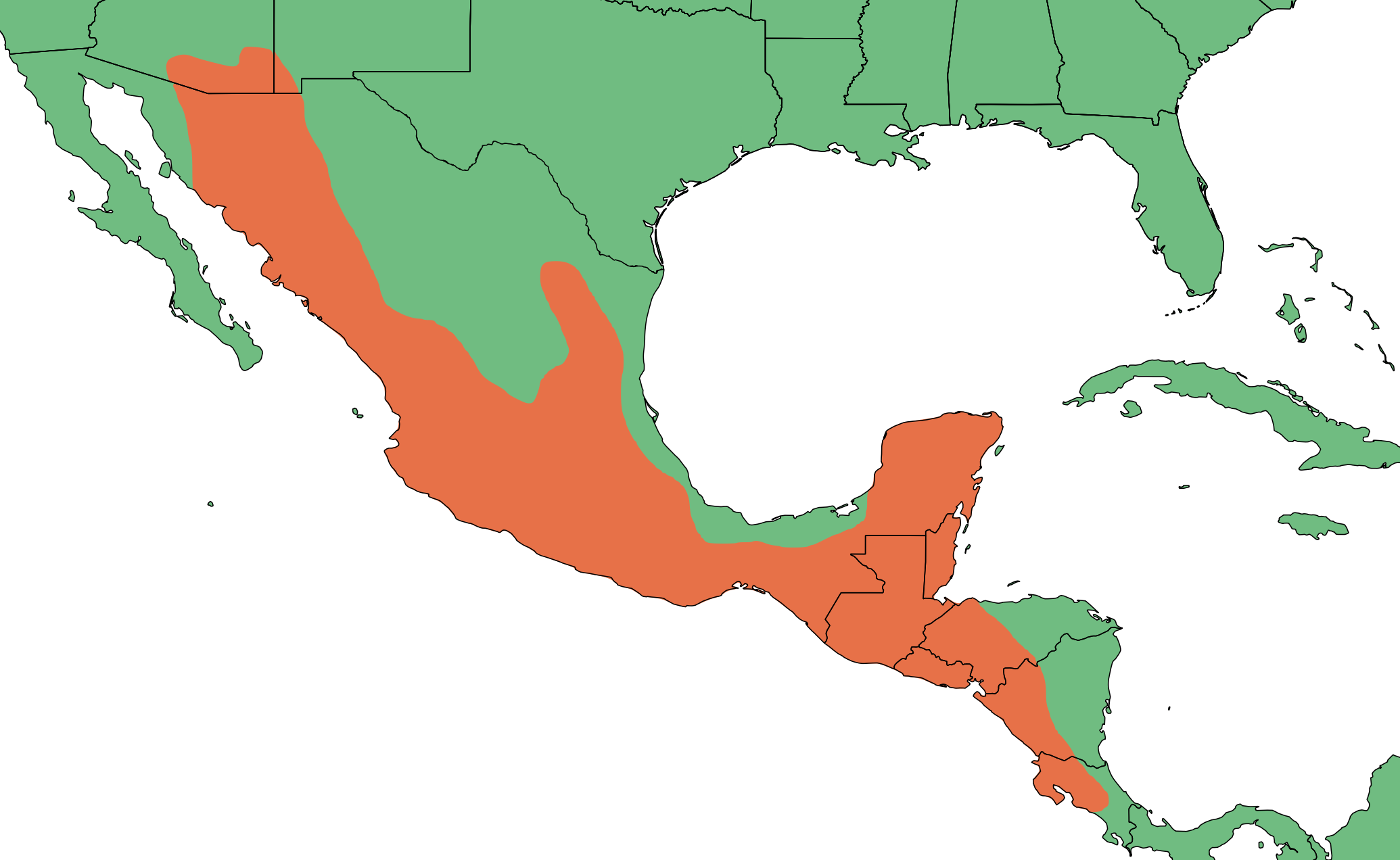

Synonyms
- Coluber triaspis Cope, 1866; Coluber chlorosoma Günther, 1894; Elaphe chlorosoma — Stejneger & Barbour, 1917; Elaphe triaspis — Amaral, 1929; Senticolis triaspis — Dowling & Fries, 1987

= Senticolis =

Genus of snakes

Senticolis is a genus of nonvenomous snake in the family Colubridae. The genus Senticolis is monotypic, containing the sole species Senticolis triaspis, also known as the green rat snake. The species is endemic to Central America, Mexico, southern Arizona, and southern New Mexico.

== Description ==
Senticolis triaspis may grow to a total length (including tail) of 160 cm (63 in). Dorsally, it is green or olive green, and ventrally it is light yellow. The head is elongated, the body is slender, and the smooth dorsal scales are arranged in 31–39 rows.

== Habitat ==
Senticolis triaspis usually inhabits evergreen forests and grassland.

== Geographic range ==
Senticolis triaspis is well distributed in the Baboquivari, Pajarito, Atascosa, Santa Rita, Empire, Patagonia, Chiricahua, Swisshelm, Pedregosa, and Peloncillo mountains of southeastern Arizona.

== Diet ==
Senticolis triaspis consumes small animals such as lizards, birds, and bats, killing them by deadly constriction.

== Behavior ==
Senticolis triaspis is primarily diurnal.

== Reproduction ==
An adult female of S. triaspis is able to lay up to nine eggs in a clutch.

== Subspecies ==
Three subspecies are recognized as being valid, including the nominotypical subspecies.

- Senticolis triaspis intermedia (Boettger, 1883) – Arizona, New Mexico, northern Mexico
- Senticolis triaspis mutabilis (Cope, 1885) – Central America
- Senticolis triaspis triaspis (Cope, 1866) – southern Mexico

Nota bene: A trinomial authority in parentheses indicates that the subspecies was originally described in a genus other than Senticolis.
