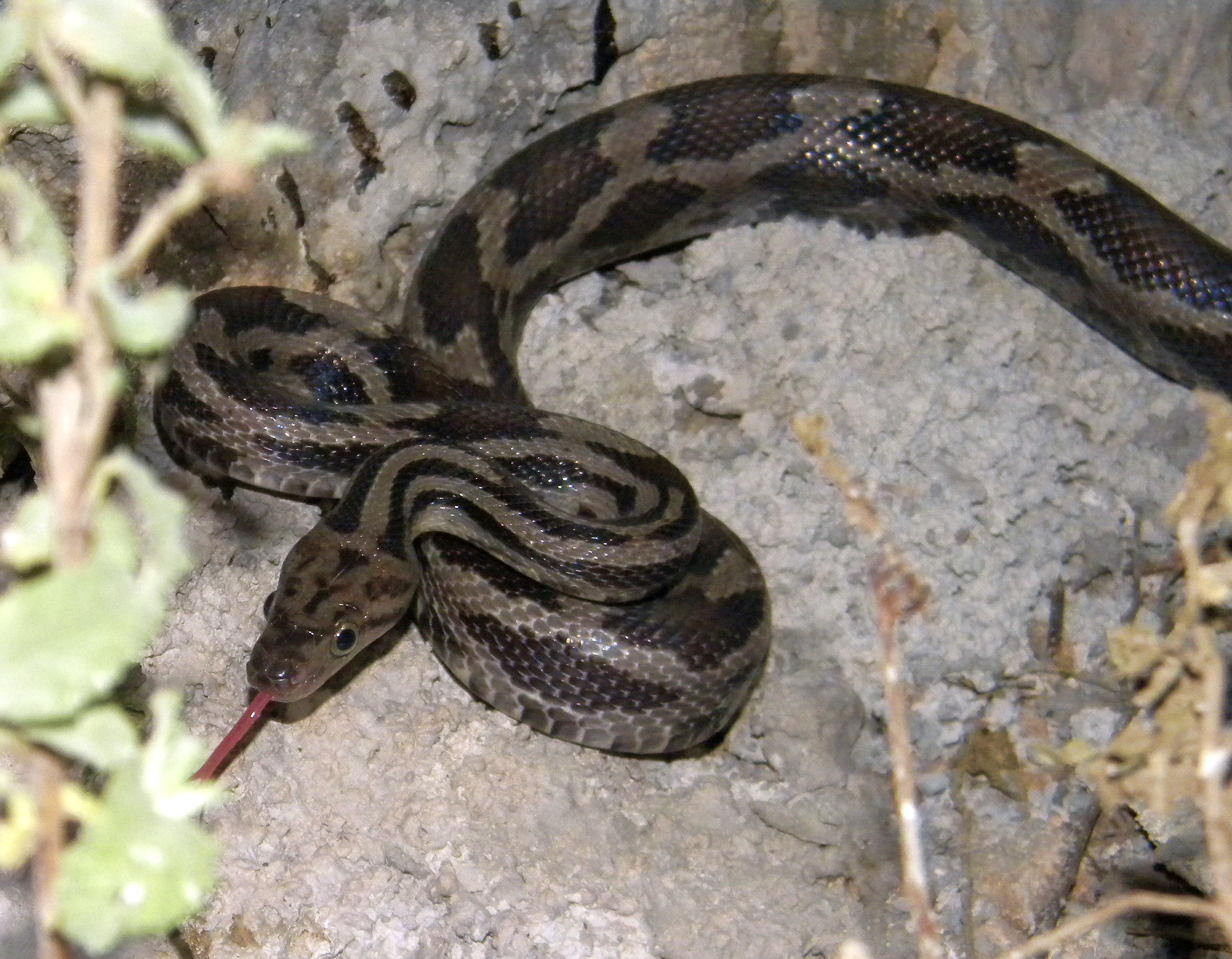
- Yellow-red rat snake, (Pseudelaphe flavirufa)

Scientific classification
- Kingdom: Animalia
- Phylum: Chordata
- Class: Reptilia
- Order: Squamata
- Suborder: Serpentes
- Family: Colubridae
- Tribe: Lampropeltini
- Genus: Pseudelaphe; Mertens & Rosenberg, 1943

= Pseudelaphe =

Genus of snakes

Pseudelaphe is a genus of nonvenomous snakes in the subfamily Colubrinae of the family Colubridae. The genus is native to parts of Middle America.

== Geographic distribution ==
Species of the genus Pseudelaphe are found in Belize, Guatemala, Honduras, Mexico, and Nicaragua.

== Species ==
The genus Pseudelaphe contains two species that are recognized as being valid.

- Pseudelaphe flavirufa (Cope, 1867) – yellow-red rat snake
- Pseudelaphe phaescens (Dowling, 1952) – Yucatán rat snake
