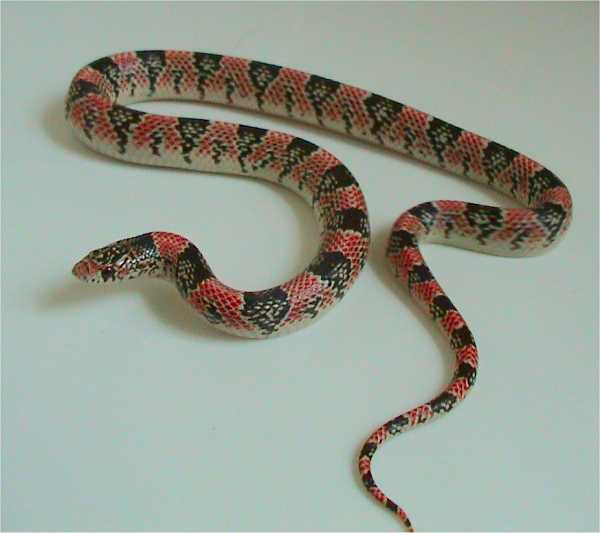
- Texas long-nosed snake (Rhinocheilus lecontei tessellatus)

Scientific classification
- Kingdom: Animalia
- Phylum: Chordata
- Class: Reptilia
- Order: Squamata
- Suborder: Serpentes
- Family: Colubridae
- Tribe: Lampropeltini
- Genus: Rhinocheilus; Baird & Girard, 1853

Species
- Three recognized species, see article.

= Rhinocheilus =

Genus of snakes

Rhinocheilus is a genus of snakes, commonly called the long-nosed snakes, in the family Colubridae. The genus is native to the western United States and Mexico.

== Species and subspecies ==
The genus Rhinocheilus contains the following species and subspecies which are recognized as being valid.

- Rhinocheilus antonii Dugès, 1886
- Rhinocheilus etheridgei Grismer, 1990 – Etheridge's long-nosed snake
- Rhinocheilus lecontei Baird & Girard, 1853 – long-nosed snake
  - Rhinocheilus lecontei lecontei Baird & Girard, 1853 – western long-nosed snake
  - Rhinocheilus lecontei tessellatus Garman, 1883 – Texas long-nosed snake
