= Mountain Spring (Imperial County, California) =

Spring in Imperial County, California, United States

Coordinates: 32°40′29″N 116°06′20″W

Mountain Spring is a spring in the Jacumba Mountains, in Imperial County, California. It is located at an elevation 2,323 feet / 708 meters near the head of In-Ko-Pah Gorge and the source of Myer Creek.

== History ==
Mountain Spring was water source for the Mountain Spring Stage Station on the road that ran between San Diego and Yuma, Arizona from 1863.
