= Herndon Dowling =

American herpetologist

Herndon Glenn Dowling Jr.
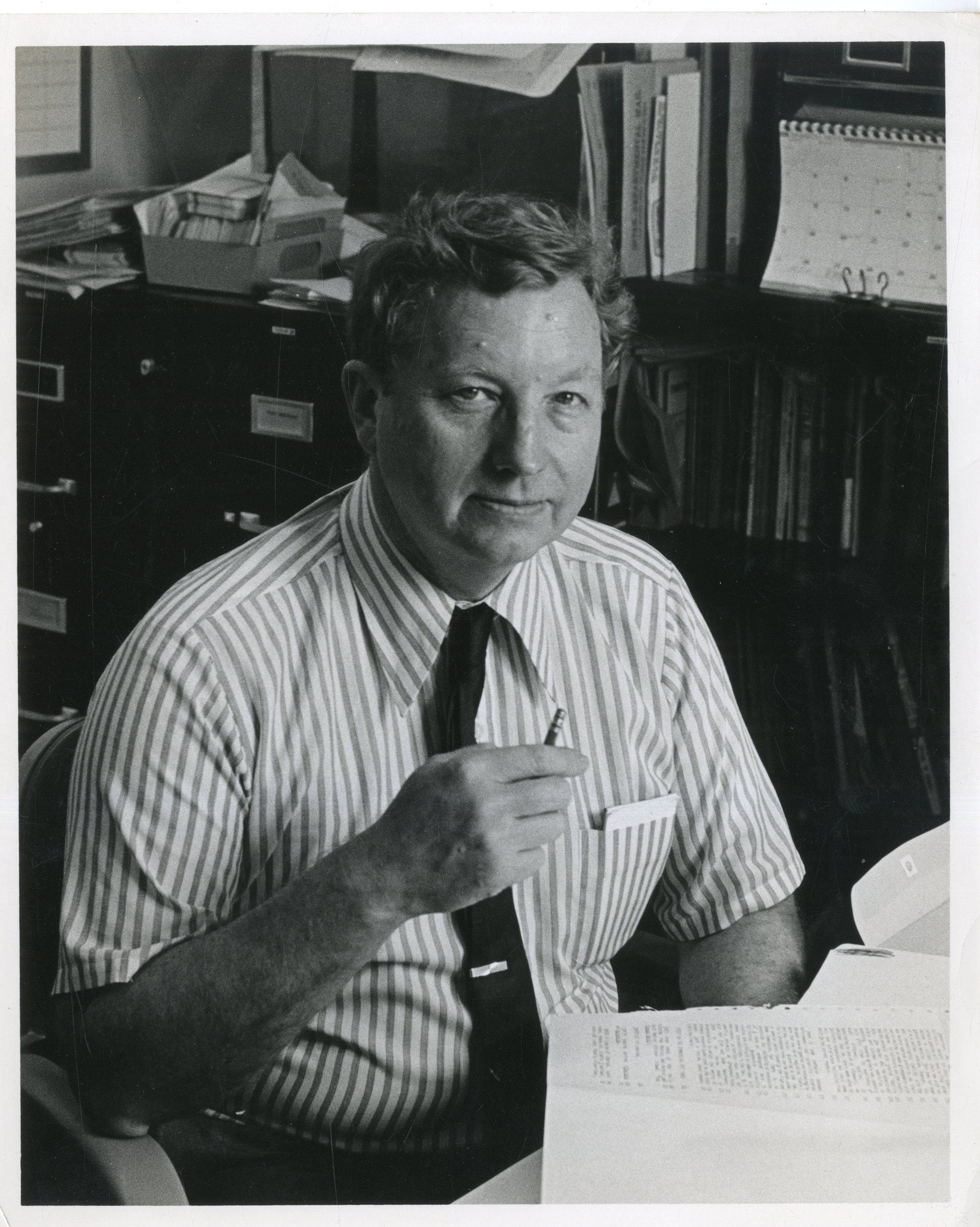
- Dowling at NYU
- Born: April 2, 1921; Cullman, Alabama, USA
- Died: June 24, 2015 (aged 94)
- Occupation: Herpetologist

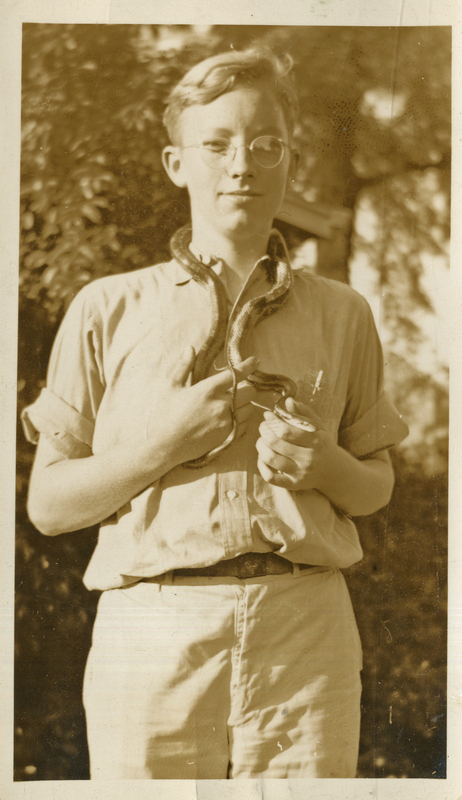
Dowling as a young man

Herndon Glenn Dowling Jr. (1921–2015) was an American herpetologist whose work focused on identifying, reclassifying, and describing new species and genera through a refined system of classification based on anatomical features. By focusing on hemipenes and other key anatomical structures, he was responsible for reclassification of various snake species and identified their evolutionary relationships.

== Early life and education ==
Born on April 2, 1921, in Cullman, Alabama, Herndon Glenn Dowling Jr. showed early promise as a naturalist and thrived under the mentorship of dedicated professors at the University of Alabama. Alongside friends, he uncovered a fossilized skeleton of a mosasaur in a chalk gully, a groundbreaking discovery that led to his first scientific publication in 1941.

At the outbreak of World War II, Dowling had enlisted in the U.S. Marine Corps reserves. When called up to active duty, he was a Second Lieutenant, assigned to photo intelligence, ultimately playing a role in the successful Allied invasion of Okinawa. Dowling's observation skills allowed him to spot camouflaged enemy artillery positions, leading to strategic landings. During this time, his interest in herpetology continued to blossom. He was ordered to collect and study venomous snakes for the Navy and Marines who were encountering these animals in the Pacific theater. Eventually, Dowling was among the principal authors of Poisonous Snakes of the World, a widely distributed resource on snake identification.

== Career ==
After returning from military service, Dowling pursued advanced studies in zoology at the University of Alabama, then completed his doctorate at the University of Michigan, focusing on the taxonomy of the Elaphe genus of snakes. His academic career began with positions at Haverford College and the University of Arkansas, where he established Arkansas's first vertebrate natural history course. When he took a bold stand against segregation policies, his contract was not renewed.

In 1959, Dowling was appointed Reptile Curator at the New York Zoological Park, now known as the Bronx Zoo, where he set new standards in reptile research and care. In 1962, Dowling was also serving on the faculty at Arizona State University, a position he would hold for the next ten years.

Upon his arrival at the American Museum of Natural History, Dowling launched a project to index herpetological publications. In 1972, Dowling also began teaching at New York University. Dowling's work attracted funding from the National Science Foundation (NSF), which recognized the potential of his research and his work in herpetology. Initially, grants supported his HISS project. HISS was a journal (published 1968–1974) focused on organizing herpetological data into a user-friendly format, allowing scientists to quickly find relevant research and references. This work was done on the eve of the data revolution brought about by computers, and this digest of data was essential for researchers. Under Dowling's guidance, HISS was not simply about collecting data; it was about envisioning the needs of modern researchers, and made AMNH a global hub for herpetology.

In 1975, when Dowling joined the faculty of NYU, he employed his own philosophy in teaching herpetology. Each spring, he led students on immersive field trips along the East Coast, allowing them to observe and study species they could not see in New York. His field trips became a fixture of his herpetology education, and his group of students—endearingly known as "Dowling's Angels"—included future leaders in biology.

In collaboration with herpetologist Bill Duellman, Dowling developed Systematic Herpetology, a reference still used in the field. In addition to the Systematic Herpetology project, he worked on herpetological publications with grants from NSF.

== Retirement and legacy ==
Dowling retired in 1991 and became a professor emeritus at NYU. While retired, Dowling moved back to his home state of Alabama where he continued to teach, research and publish. He maintained Dowling House, in Port Maria, Jamaica, where research scientists were frequent guests.

In 2015, his papers were donated to the Western Connecticut State University Archives where they are curated by Dowling's former student and colleague, Dr. Theodora Pinou.
