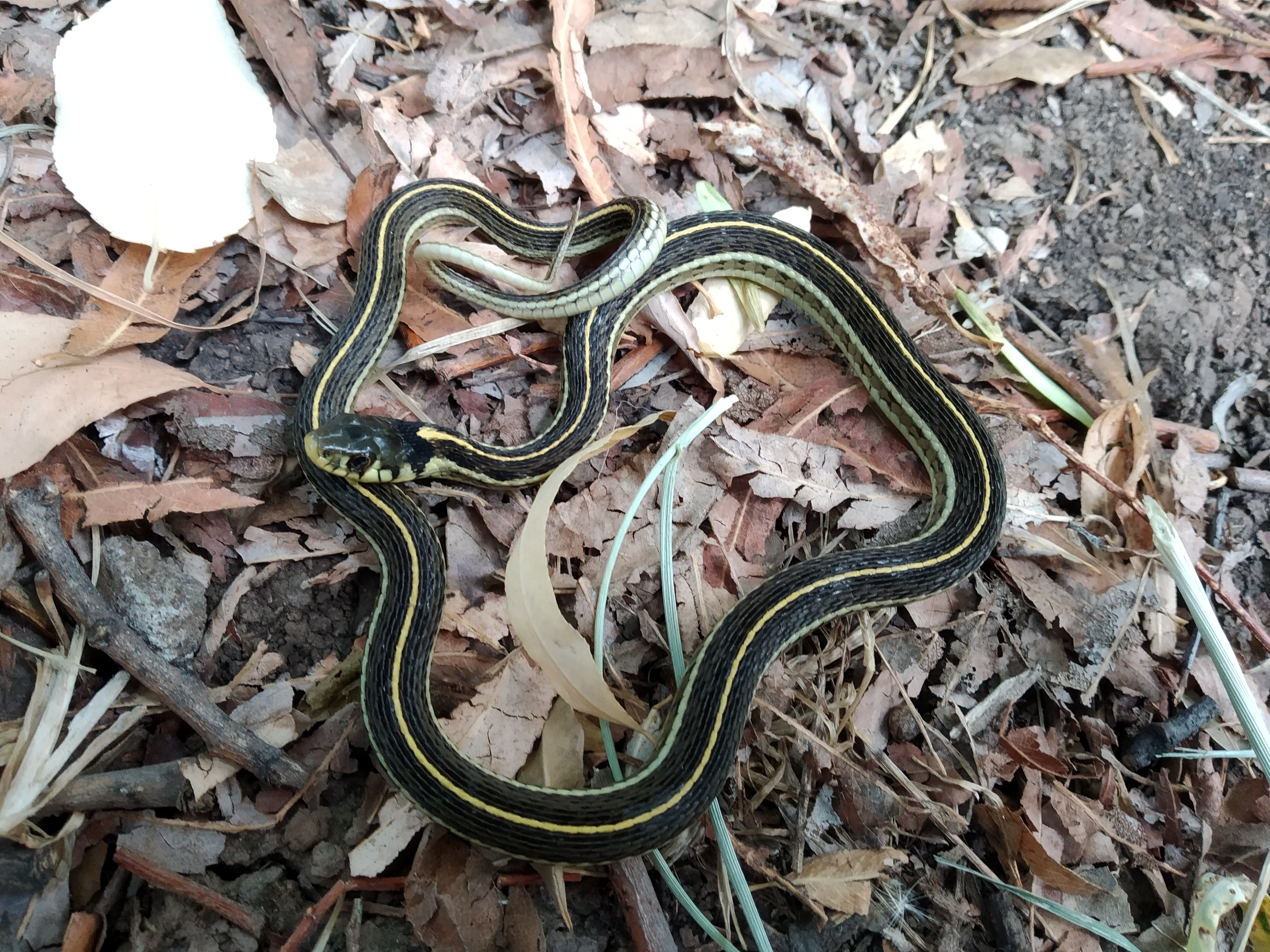

Conservation status
- Least Concern (IUCN 3.1)

Scientific classification
- Kingdom: Animalia
- Phylum: Chordata
- Class: Reptilia
- Order: Squamata
- Suborder: Serpentes
- Family: Colubridae
- Genus: Thamnophis
- Species: T. pulchrilatus

Binomial name
- Thamnophis pulchrilatus (Cope, 1885)

= Yellow-throated garter snake =

Species of snake

The yellow-throated garter snake (Thamnophis pulchrilatus) is a species of snake in the family Colubridae. It is found in Mexico. Very little is known for certain about this snake, but it has been observed to reach lengths of 18–36 in (46–91 cm). They are distinguishable by their characteristic coloring, having a dark brown or black dorsal side accented with a yellow to light green stripe along the spine. A checkered yellow and black pattern can be observed along the sides, and the throat of the snake is bright yellow. Thamnophis pulchrilatus are relatively slender and light snakes.

== Taxonomic history ==
This species has been considered a synonym of Thamnophis cyrtopsis or of Thamnophis eques. It was first described by Cope in 1885 as Eutaenia pulchrilatus.

== Distribution and habitat ==
It is found mainly in wooded areas, specifically oak and pine forests at high elevations, but has occasionally been found in grassy fields as well. Some sources report that they inhabit the southwestern United States, but no sightings have ever been confirmed outside of Mexico, and these U.S. reports are likely T. cyrtopsis or T. eques.

== Biology ==
=== Diet ===
These snakes are believed to eat small fish, lizards, frogs, toads, and even worms. There have been two confirmed cases of predation: the first involved a captured female that regurgitated a mountain tree frog (Dryophytes eximius), and the second was a captured snake that was discovered to have eaten a Bell's false brook salamander (Isthmura belli).

=== Behavior ===
Two different defensive behaviors have been observed in yellow-throated garter snakes in a study conducted in Mexico. Two individuals exhibited defensive behavior when prevented from escaping, which involved forming rings with the body and tucking the head away, while moving the tip of the tail back and forth in the air. A third individual flattened its body to the ground for around thirty seconds before making a dash for escape.

=== Reproduction ===
Very little is known about the reproductive behaviors of the yellow-throated garter snake. They are known to be ovoviviparous, meaning the young hatch from their eggs inside the mother and are birthed live. One brief field study was able to capture a pregnant female and determine that her clutch consisted of 15 eggs, which expanded the known amount of young hatched at a time to reach from 7-15.

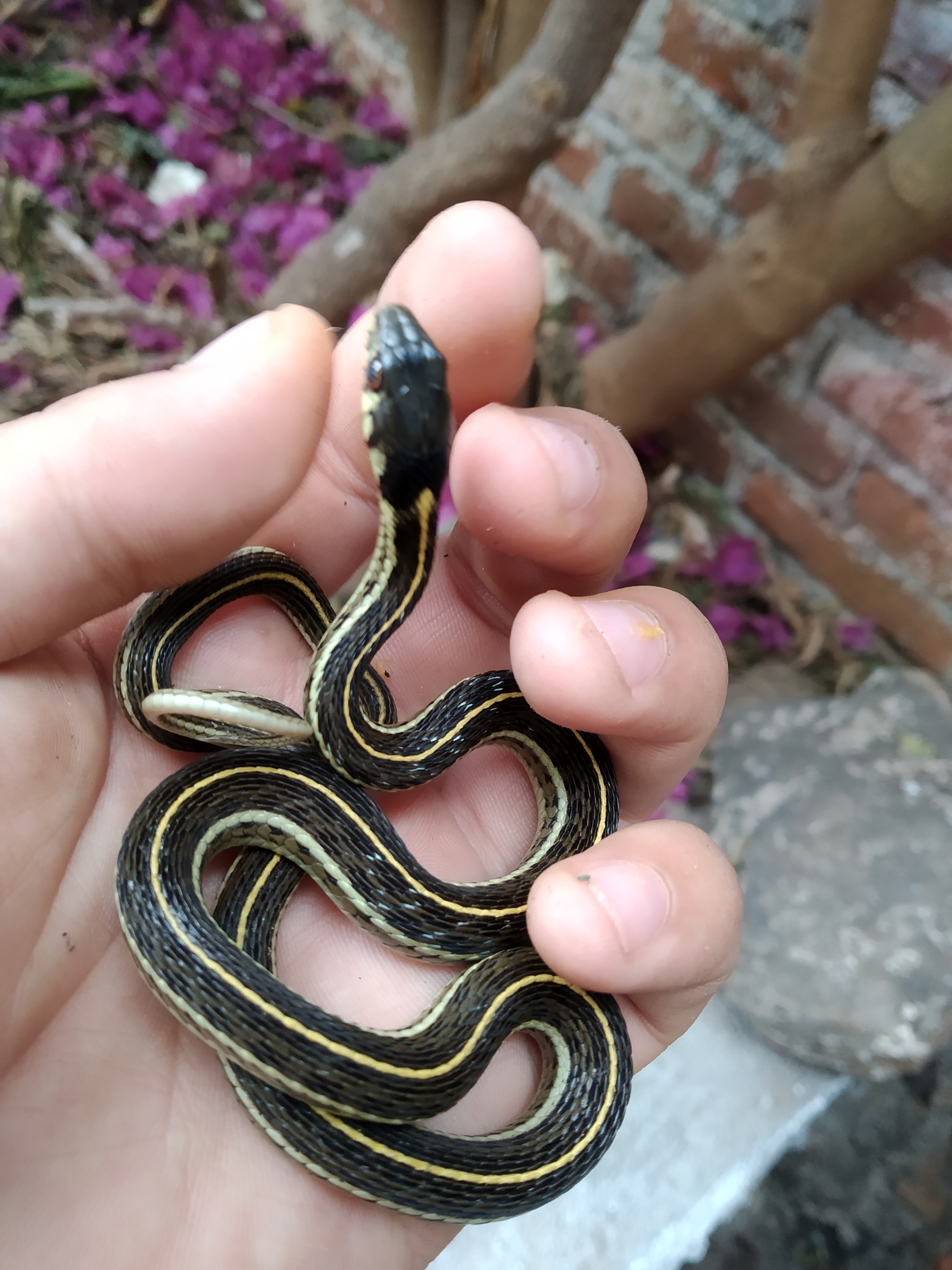
Baby yellow throated garter snake

== Threats ==
The main threat that the yellow-throated garter snake faces is habitat loss through a variety of different avenues. One way is urban development of the woodlands and grasslands where they live. Another is deforestation and logging of their ecosystem. Agricultural development can also cause issues for these snakes, however they are currently listed as Least Concern by the IUCN.
