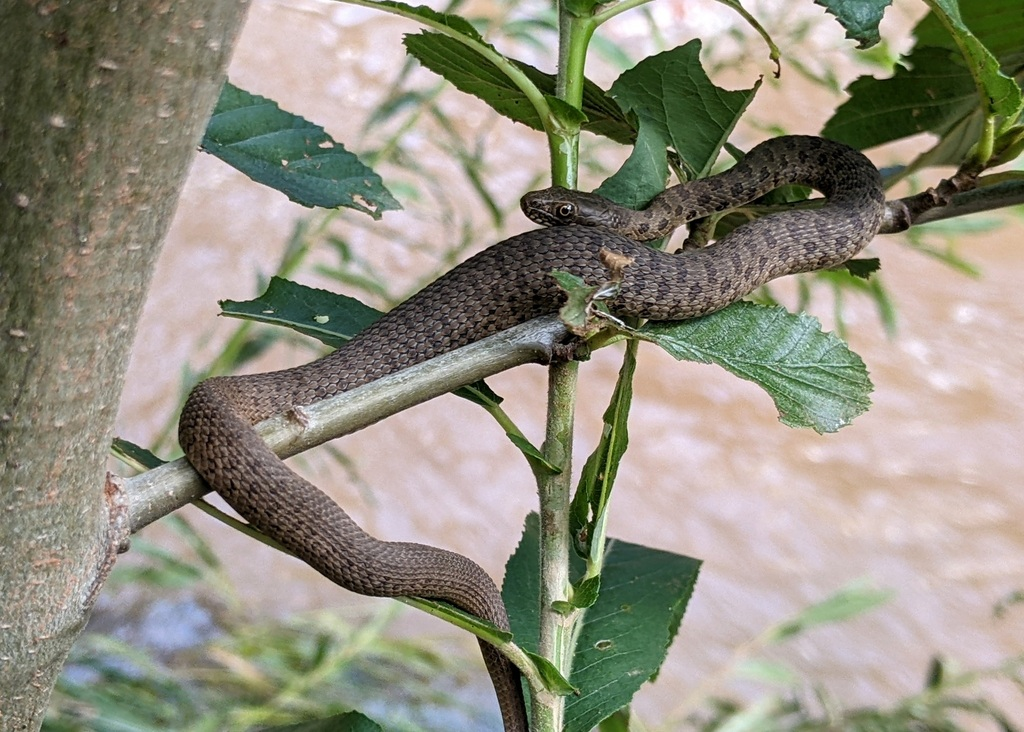
- Narrowhead garter snake in Coconino County, Arizona

Conservation status
- Least Concern (IUCN 3.1)

- Vulnerable (NatureServe)

Scientific classification
- Kingdom: Animalia
- Phylum: Chordata
- Class: Reptilia
- Order: Squamata
- Suborder: Serpentes
- Family: Colubridae
- Genus: Thamnophis
- Species: T. rufipunctatus

Binomial name
- Thamnophis rufipunctatus (Cope, 1875)
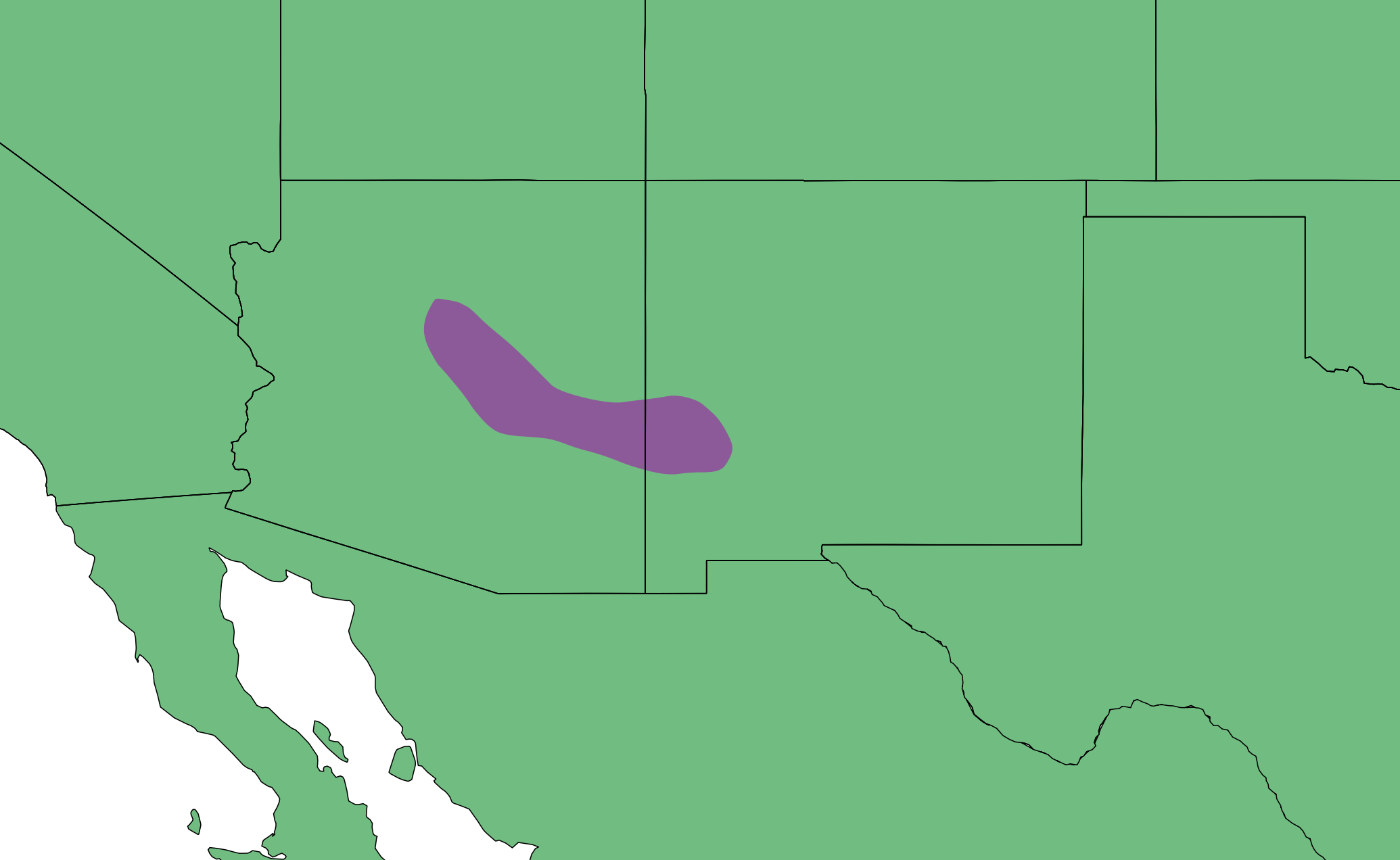

Synonyms
- Chilopoma rufipunctatum Cope, 1875; Atomarchus multimaculatus Cope, 1883; Eutaenia multimaculata – Cope, 1886; Thamnophis rufipunctatus – Stebbins, 1985; Nerodia rufipunctatus – Chiasson & Lowe, 1989; Thamnophis rufipunctatus – Rossman et al., 1996

= Narrow-headed garter snake =

Species of snake

The narrow-headed garter snake, Thamnophis rufipunctatus, is a species of nonvenomous garter snake that is endemic to the southwestern United States. Its common names also include narrowhead garter snake and narrowhead watersnake.

== Taxonomy ==
Chiasson and Lowe (1989) suggested the species be included in the genus Nerodia (watersnakes) due to its highly aquatic nature, however, this classification was later rejected based on genetic data.

The Madrean narrow-headed garter snake and Southern Durango spotted garter snake were at times considered subspecies of the narrow-headed garter snake, but are now given full species status based on genetic analysis.

=== Etymology ===
The scientific name Thamnophis rufipunctatus is a combination of Ancient Greek and New Latin that means "bush snake punctuated with red". The generic name Thamnophis is derived from the Greek "thamnos" (bush) and "ophis" (snake) and the specific name rufipunctatus is derived from the New Latin "rufi-" (red) and "punctatus" (punctuated), referring to the snake's reddish-brown spots.

== Geographic range ==
It is found in Arizona and New Mexico at or near the Mogollon Rim, mainly in canyon-bound headwaters of the Gila and San Francisco rivers and their tributaries.

It is not thought to occur in Mexico. Populations in Mexico that were previously considered subspecies of Thamnophis rufipunctatus are now reclassified as separate species.

== Description ==
The snake is blue-grey to olive-grey, or greenish to brown, and it has brown, orange, or black spots on the back. The total length of adults is 81–112 cm (32–44 in) (about 81–112 cm). Its most notable feature is its long, narrow snout, resulting in a rather triangular-shaped head.

It has eight or 9 upper labial scales, one of which enters the eye, two or three preocular scales, two to four postoculars, and one anterior temporal scale. The keeled dorsal scales are arranged in 21 rows at midbody. Ventrals number 152–177; the anal plate is entire; the subcaudals number 65–87, and are divided.

== Habitat and behavior ==
It is found near river banks or streams at higher elevations (2,300 to 8,000 ft (701 to 2,430 m)), and prefers clear, rocky streams with pool and riffle habitat, though it has also been observed at lake shorelines. It is one of the most aquatic of all garter snakes.

Narrow-headed garter snakes hibernate between October or November to March in rocky outcroppings above the flood line. They are viviparous and give birth to 4-17 young in late July or August. They are sexually mature at around 2 years.

They are often found underwater, and primarily forage on the bottom of streams. They can also be found perched in vegetation near the water, or basking near the water. They are capable of holding their breath for several minutes.

== Diet ==
These snakes are piscivorous, meaning they primarily eat fish. Their diet includes dace, chub, sucker, and both native and introduced trout. They have been reported to eat tadpoles and salamanders, but these are based on historical captive reports and not likely a common part of their diet.

Unlike other garter snakes, they are ambush predators, and will sit and wait for prey to approach. Due to their unique mass, the specific gravity of the snake in water is 1, meaning they neither sink nor float and can maintain their position in the water.

== Conservation ==
The snake's population has declined significantly within its range.

In 2007, the International Union for Conservation of Nature (IUCN) classified it as Least Concern because of its wide range and presumably large population (which included Mexican populations now classified as different species). NatureServe currently lists it as G3 - Vulnerable.

In 2014, the species was listed as Threatened under the Endangered Species Act. The FWS stated that population densities had notably declined and the snake was found in only 5 of 16 historical locations, though its status on tribal lands was unknown.

The main reasons for threatened status are the decline of river habitats, nonnative predatory fish such as brown trout which compete with the narrow-headed garter snake for prey, and nonnative crayfish and bullfrogs which both compete with the snake for prey as well as prey on juvenile snakes. Additional threats include poisons intended to eliminate invasive species, drought, catastrophic wildfires, and possibly factors such as disease, siltation, killing and collection by humans, and overgrazing.

In 2018, the Center for Biological Diversity sued the U.S. Fish and Wildlife Service for failing to implement proposed critical habitat after the species was listed as threatened. In October, 2021, the FWS designated 23,785 acres of critical habitat for the narrow-headed garter snake, including 447 miles of streams. This was significantly less than the over 420,000 acres originally proposed in 2013. In August 2023, the Center for Biological Diversity again sued the government for reducing the snake's habitat.
