= Wade Fox =

American zoologist and herpetologist

- Born: June 2, 1920; Hilton, Virginia, US
- Died: September 20, 1964 (aged 43-44)
- Education: UC Berkeley; University of North Carolina
- Scientific career
- Fields: Herpetology
- Institutions: University of Southern California; Louisiana State University
- Theses: Biology of the garter snakes of the San Francisco Bay Region (1950); Variation in the deer mouse (Peromyscus maniculatus) along the lower Columbia River (1946)
- Doctoral advisor: Robert C. Stebbins

Rufus Wade Fox Jr. (June 2, 1920 – September 20, 1964), was an American zoologist and herpetologist from the University of California, Berkeley. He specialized in the anatomy of snakes and the systematics of the western garter snakes.

== Biography ==
Wade Fox was born on June 2, 1920, in Hilton, Virginia.

He graduated from the University of North Carolina in 1943 and then earned a Master's (1946) and doctoral degree at the University of California, Berkeley, working as Curatorial Assistant of in the Museum of Vertebrate Zoology from 1943 to 1949, and earning a PhD under Robert C. Stebbins in 1950. His dissertation topic was "Biology of the Garter Snakes of the San Francisco Bay Region". Later he became president of Herpetologists' League and an editor of the journal Copeia.

He named several garter snake (Thamnophis) subspecies, including Thamnophis elegans terrestris, Thamnophis elegans aquaticus (now a synonym of T. atratus atratus) and Thamnophis sirtalis fitchi. He is commemorated in the name of the Fox's mountain meadow snake (Adelophis foxi ).

Wade Fox died of a heart attack following heart surgery on September 20, 1964.

== Partial bibliography ==
- Fox W (1951). "Relationships among the garter snakes of the Thamnophis elegans rassenkreis". Univ. California Publ. Zool. 50: 485–529.
- Fox W (1951). "The status of the gartersnake, Thamnophis sirtalis tetrataenia". Copeia. 1951 (4): 257–267. doi:10.2307/1438309. JSTOR 1438309.
- Fox W (1954). "Genetic and environmental variation in the timing of the reproductive cycles of male garter snakes". J. Morphol. 95 (3): 415–450. doi:10.1002/jmor.1050950303. S2CID 84375536.
