= West Coast garter snake =

Conservation status
- Least Concern (IUCN 3.1)

Scientific classification
- Kingdom: Animalia
- Phylum: Chordata
- Class: Reptilia
- Order: Squamata
- Suborder: Serpentes
- Family: Colubridae
- Genus: Thamnophis
- Species: T. validus

Binomial name
- Thamnophis validus (Kennicott, 1860)

Synonyms
- Regina valida Kennicott, 1860; Tropidonotus validus — Boulenger, 1893; Natrix valida — Van Denburgh, 1895; Nerodia valida — Stebbins, 1985; Thamnophis validus — A. de Queiroz & Lawson, 1994

Species of snake

The West Coast garter snake (Thamnophis validus), also known commonly as Kennicott's water snake, is a species of snake in the subfamily Natricinae of the family Colubridae. The species is endemic to Mexico. Four subspecies are recognized.

== Geographic range ==
T. validus is found in the Mexican states of Baja California Sur, Chihuahua, Guerrero, Jalisco, and Sonora.

== Reproduction ==
T. validus is viviparous.

== Subspecies ==
There are four subspecies of T. validus which are recognized as being valid, including the nominate subspecies.

- T. v. celaeno (Cope, 1861) – cape garter snake, Mexican Pacific lowlands garter snake
- T. v. isabelleae (Conant, 1953)
- T. v. thamnophisoides (Conant, 1961)
- T. v. validus (Kennicott, 1860)

Nota bene: A trinomial authority in parentheses indicates that the subspecies was originally described in a genus other than Thamnophis.

== Etymology ==
The subspecific name isabelleae is in honor of the American wildlife artist Isabelle Hunt Conant, the wife of the American herpetologist Roger Conant.

== Sources ==
- Conant, Roger (1953). "Three New Water Snakes of the Genus [Natrix] from Mexico". Natural History Miscellanea. 126: 1–9.
