= Tepalcatepec Valley garter snake =

Conservation status
- Least Concern (IUCN 3.1)

Scientific classification
- Kingdom: Animalia
- Phylum: Chordata
- Class: Reptilia
- Order: Squamata
- Suborder: Serpentes
- Family: Colubridae
- Genus: Thamnophis
- Species: T. postremus

Binomial name
- Thamnophis postremus Smith, 1942

Species of snake

The Tepalcatepec Valley garter snake (Thamnophis postremus) is a species of snake of the family Colubridae. It is found in Mexico.
