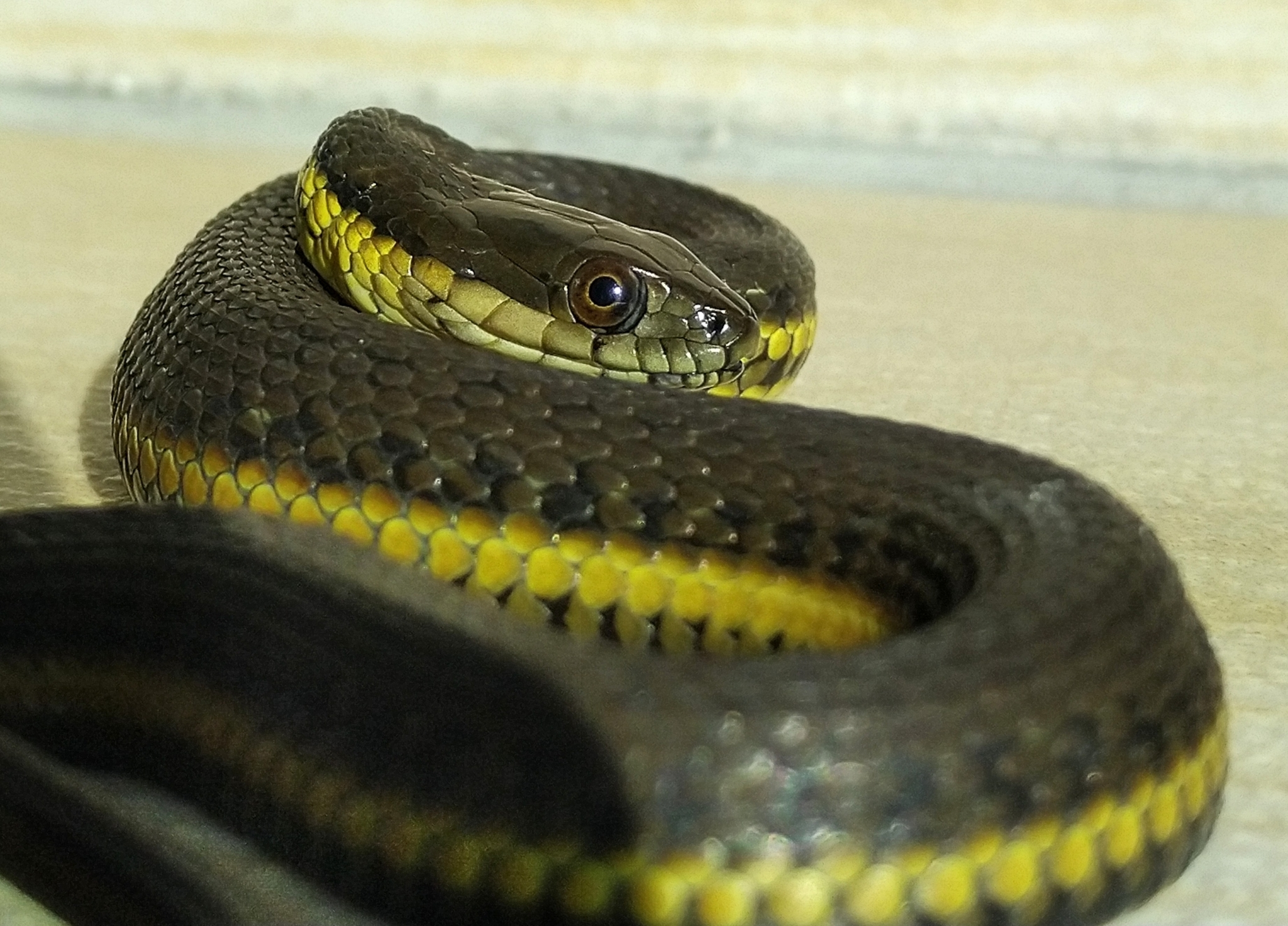

Conservation status
- Endangered (IUCN 3.1)

Scientific classification
- Kingdom: Animalia
- Phylum: Chordata
- Class: Reptilia
- Order: Squamata
- Suborder: Serpentes
- Family: Colubridae
- Genus: Thamnophis
- Species: T. melanogaster

Binomial name
- Thamnophis melanogaster (Peters, 1864)

= Blackbelly garter snake =

Species of snake

The blackbelly garter snake (Thamnophis melanogaster) is a species of snake of the family Colubridae. It is found in Mexico.

== Authority ==
First described as Tropidonotus melanogaster by Peters in 1864, this species is now recognized as Thamnophis melanogaster.

== Geographic range ==
It is found on the Central Mexican Plateau at elevations between 1,158 and 2,545 m above sea level.

== Description ==
The dorsal color of these snakes may be brown, olive green, gray, red, orange, or pink. Ventral colors include the same as the dorsal, with the addition of yellow. Dorsal patterns may include stripes and there is typically a black stripe running down the center of the belly, which explains both the common and scientific names for this species. There is little or no difference in size between the sexes of Blackbelly garter snakes.

== Habitat ==
This is a terrestrial species that occurs in temperate habitats. Although it lives on land, it has not been found more than 15 m from a body of water.

== Reproduction ==
Blackbelly garter snakes are ovoviviparous.

== Diet ==
These snakes feed exclusively under water and they are the only known Thamnophis to prey on soft-bodied crayfish. They have a highly variable diet that also includes fish, frogs, tadpoles, leeches, and earthworms. Good underwater vision and chemical cues help the snakes find and capture their prey.

== Subspecies ==
Four subspecies are known:

- gray blackbelly garter snake, T. m. canescens Smith, 1942
- Chihuahuan blackbelly garter snake, T. m. chihuahuaensis Tanner, 1959
- lined blackbelly garter snake, T. m. linearis Smith, Nixon & Smith, 1950
- Mexican blackbelly garter snake, T. m. melanogaster (Wiegmann, 1830)

== Etymology ==
The specific name melanogaster is composed of two Greek words, melanos, which means black and gaster, which means belly.

== Bibliography ==
- Manjarrez Javier, Macias Garcia Constantino, Drummond Hugh (2013). "Variation in the Diet of the Mexican Black-bellied Gartersnake Thamnophis melanogaster: Importance of Prey Availability and Snake Body Size". Journal of Herpetology. 47 (3): 413–420. doi:10.1670/12-174. S2CID 85626973.
- Gregory T. G., Gregory L. A., Macartney J. M. (1983). "Color pattern variation in Thamnophis melanogaster". Copeia. 1983 (2): 530–534. doi:10.2307/1444403. JSTOR 1444403.
- Peters, W. 1864. Über einige neue Säugethiere (Mormops, Macrotus, Vesperus, Molossus, Capromys), Amphibien (Plathydactylus, Otocryptis, Euprepes, Ungalia, Dromicus, Tropidonotus, Xenodon, Hylodes), und Fische Sillago, Sebastes, Channa, Myctophum, Carassius, Barbus, Mber. k. preuss. Akad. Wiss. Berlin [1864]: 381–399.
- Wiegmann, A. F. A. 1830. Preisverzeichnis der Säugethiere, Vögel, Amphibien, Fische und Krebse, welche von Hrn Deppe und Schiede in Mexico gesammelt worden. Berlin, 1.Sept. 1930.
