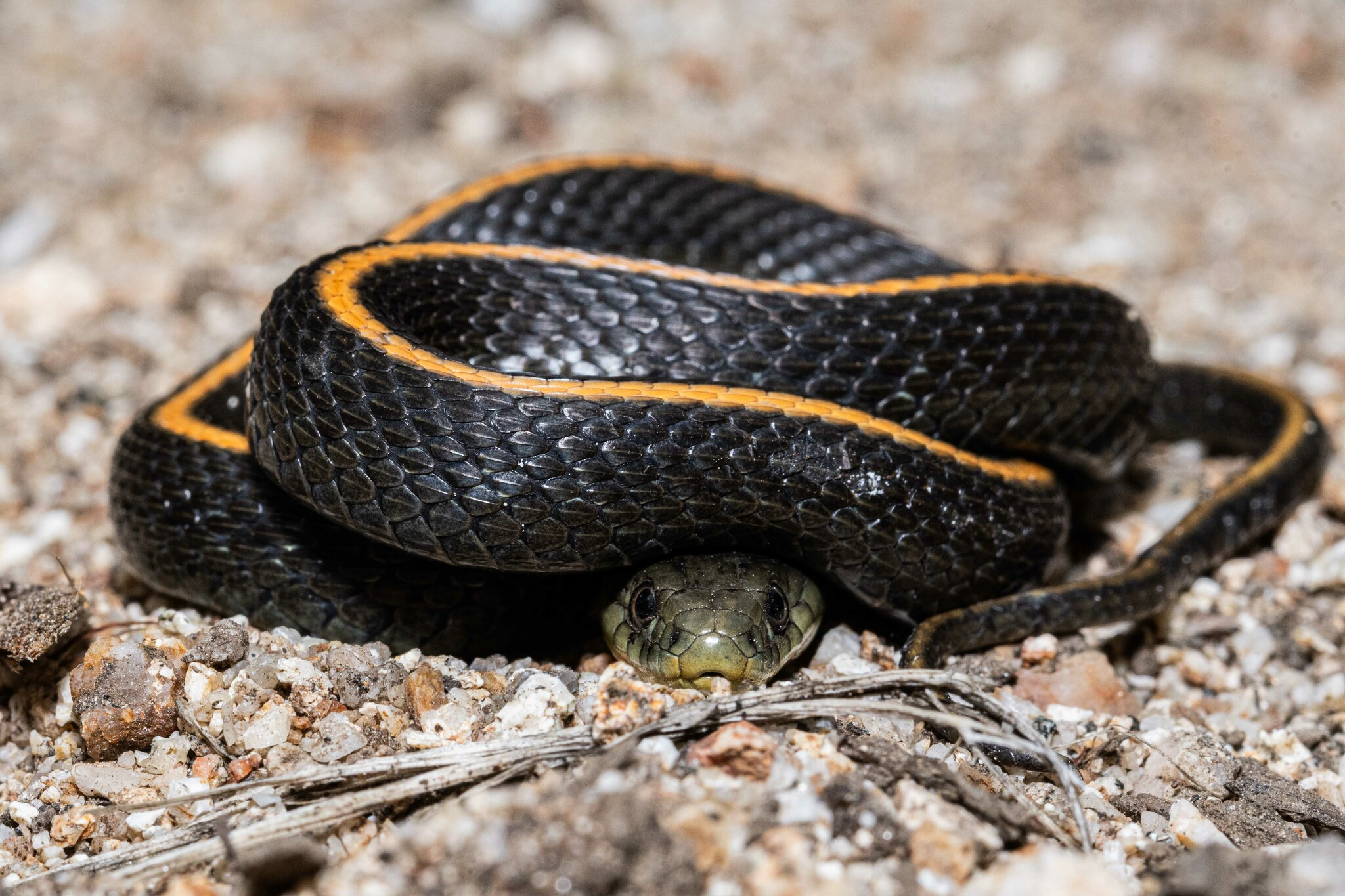
- Santa Cruz garter snake (T. a. atratus). In California

Conservation status
- Least Concern (IUCN 3.1)

Scientific classification
- Domain: Eukaryota
- Kingdom: Animalia
- Phylum: Chordata
- Class: Reptilia
- Order: Squamata
- Suborder: Serpentes
- Family: Colubridae
- Genus: Thamnophis
- Species: T. atratus

Binomial name
- Thamnophis atratus (Kennicott, 1860)

Synonyms
- Eutaenia atrata Kennicott, 1860

= Aquatic garter snake =

Species of snake

The aquatic garter snake (Thamnophis atratus) is a species of colubrid snake. Three subspecies are currently recognized.

== Geographic range ==
It is found exclusively along the coast of Oregon and California.

== Description ==
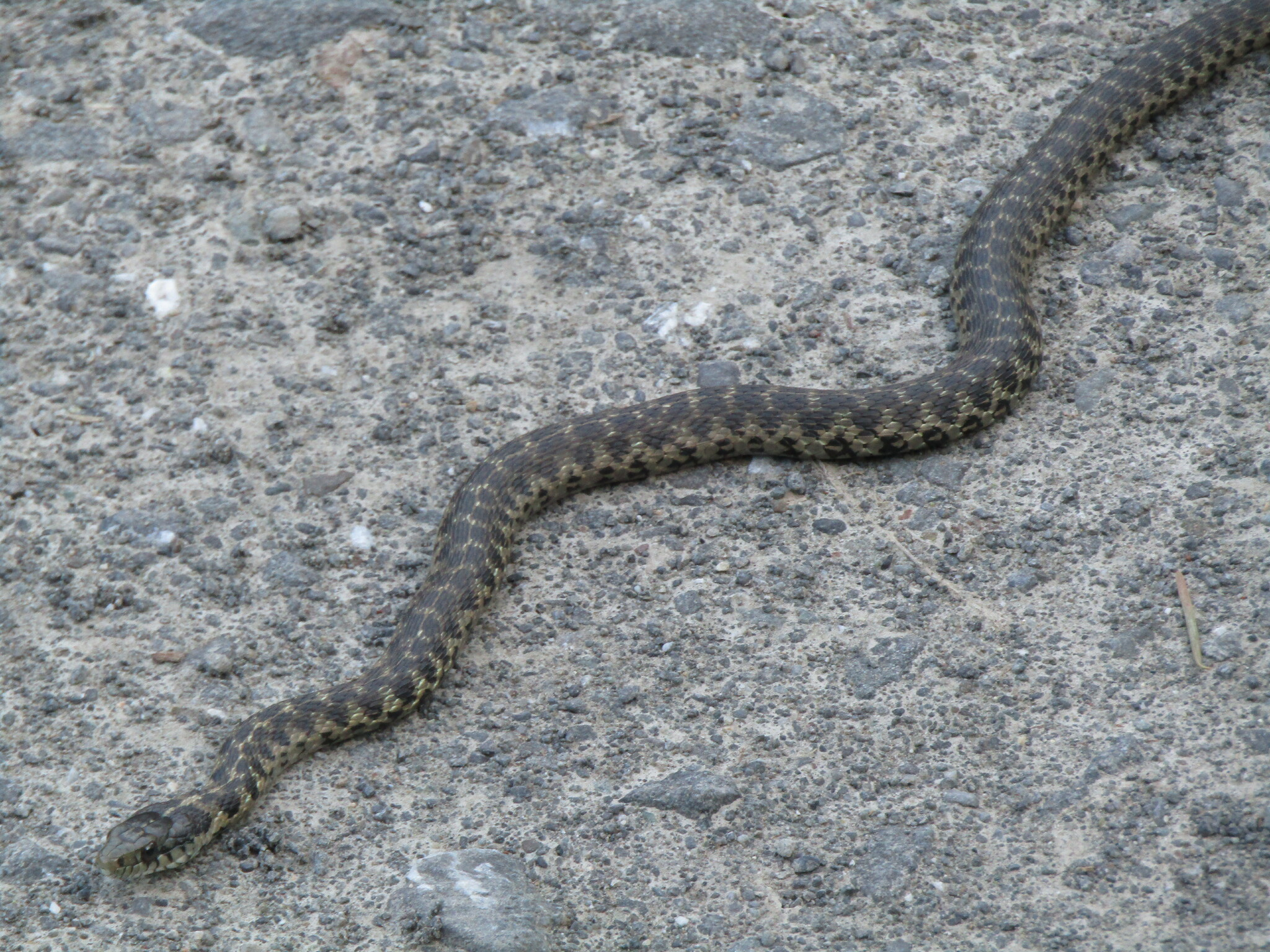
Oregon garter snake (T. a. hydrophilus), in Oregon

The aquatic garter snake grows up to 18–40 inches (46–102 cm) long. Its dorsal coloration varies greatly. The different coloration patterns are: pale gray with alternating rows of darker blotches on the sides, dark brown with borders that are less distinct, or nearly all black. A long yellow stripe running down the back may be present or absent, only confined to the neck, or just very indistinct. The throat and underside of the snake are whitish to yellow.

One color morph of the aquatic garter snake has a blue-gray background color with a faint olive-colored dorsal stripe and white dots along its sides. Another color morph has a yellow dorsal stripe with black spots along its sides. The second color morph has the more classic garter snake look; however, due to its behavior and scalation, it is grouped in this species.

== Habitat ==
It can most commonly be found on the edges of bushlands, woodlands, grasslands, and forests near ponds, marshes, streams and lakes.

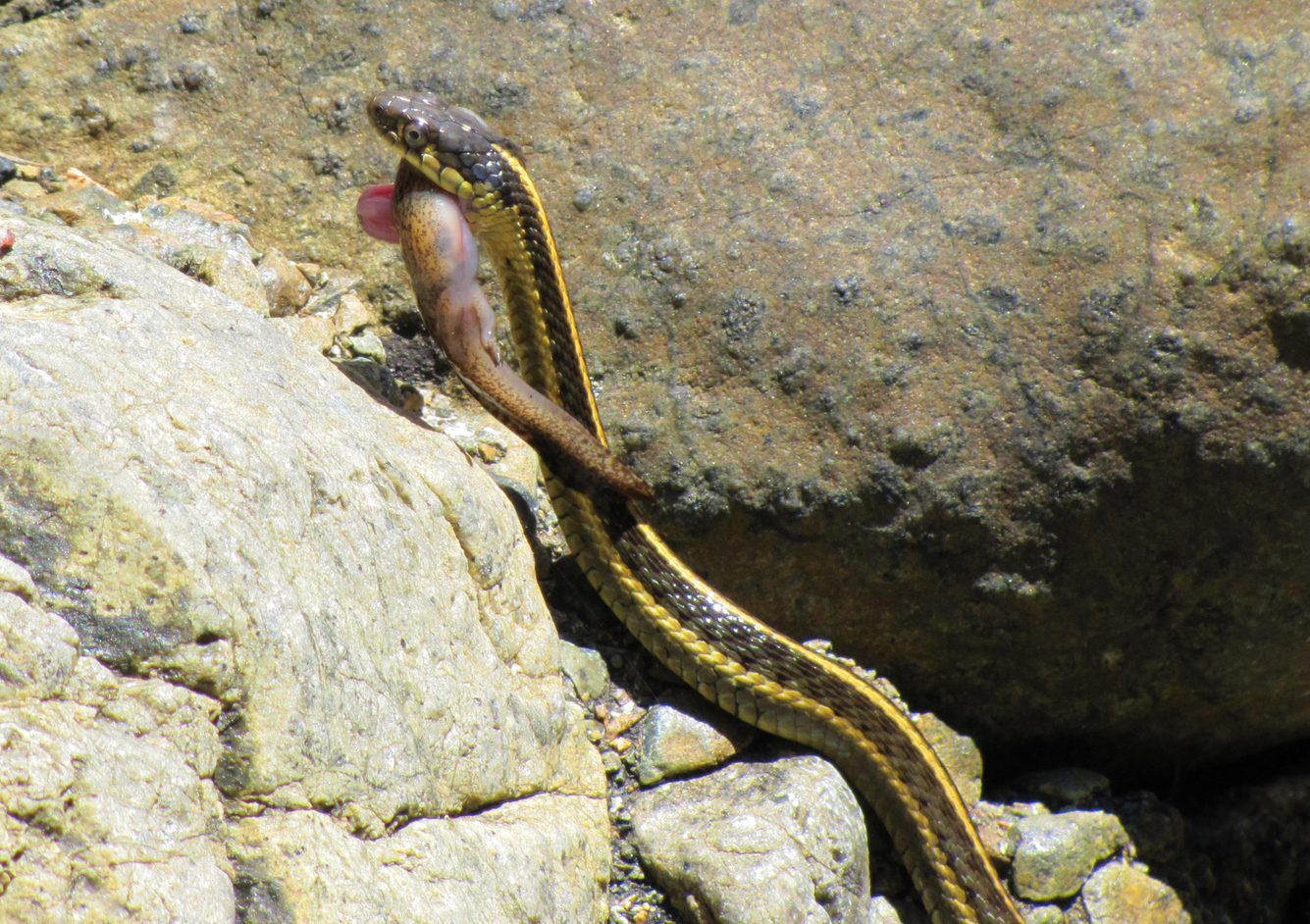
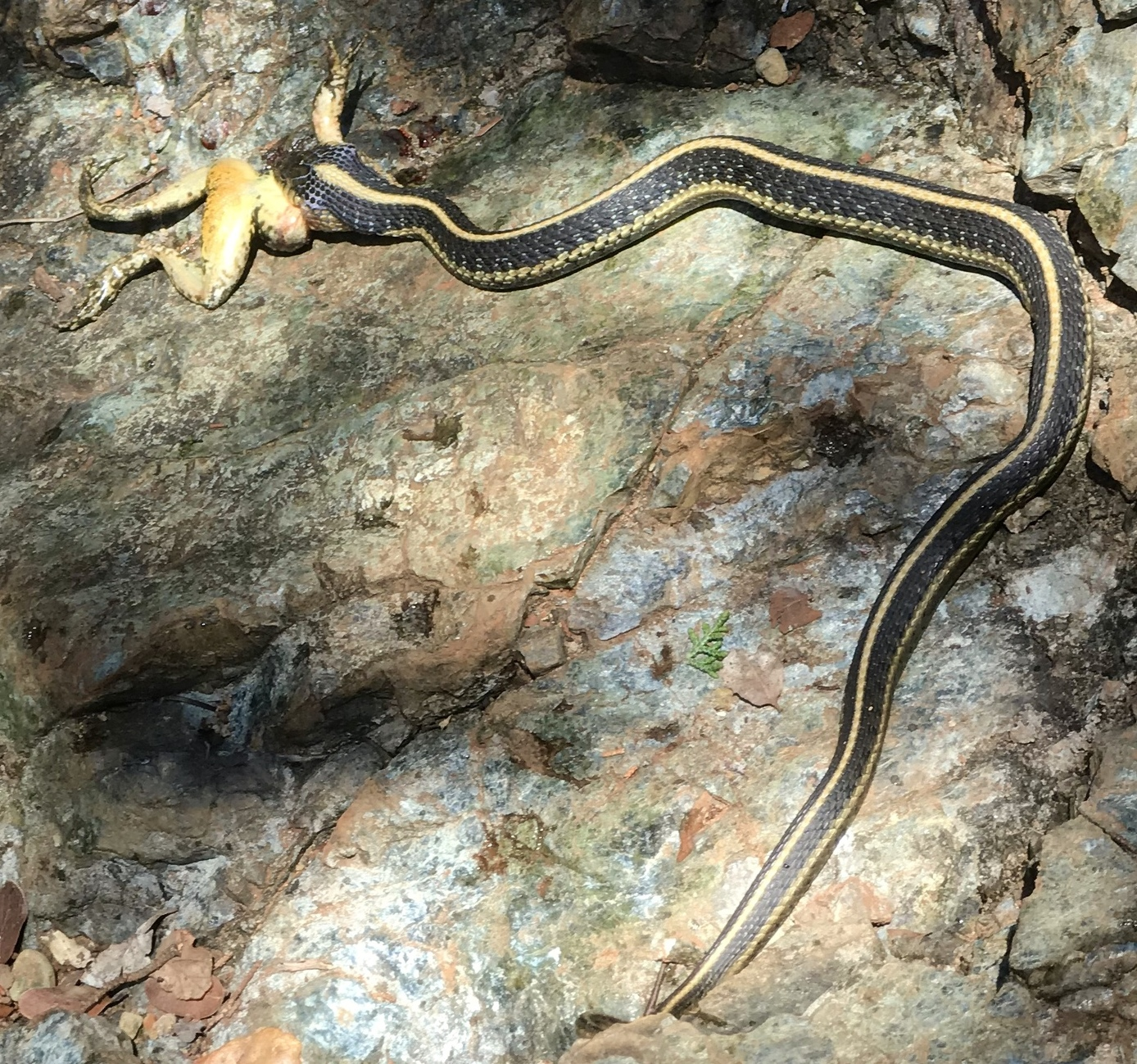
Eating a newt (left) and a foothill yellow-legged frog (right). In California.

== Behavior ==
When feeling threatened, this snake will seek shelter in a nearby water source. Occasionally, while the snake is hunting for food in a stream, it will flick its tongue above the water to mimic an insect that a small fish would usually eat, thus luring the prey into its mouth.

== Reproduction ==
The aquatic garter snake bears live young. Broods consist of three to 12 young.

== Subspecies ==
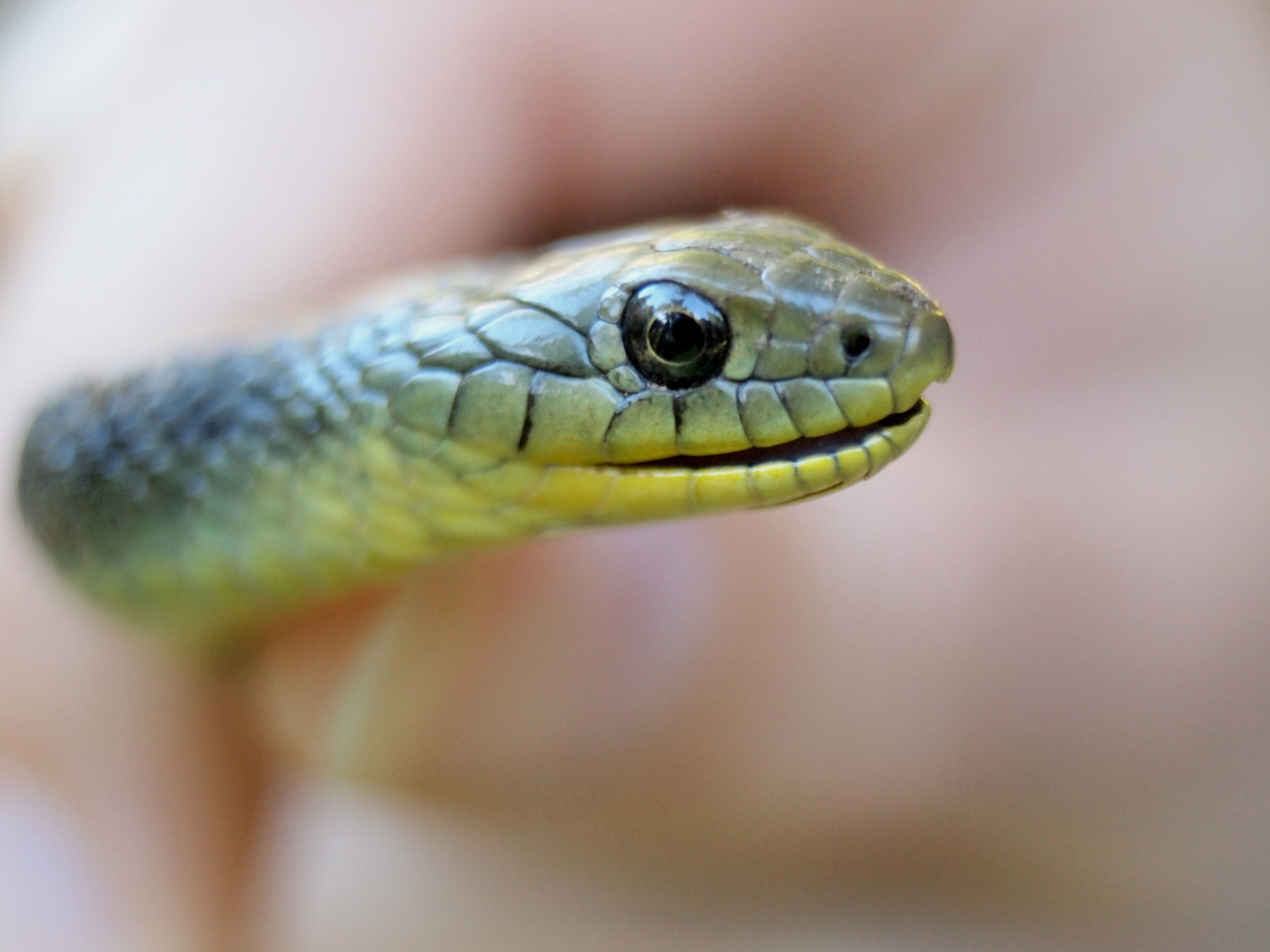
T. a atratus (Santa Cruz garter snake)

- Santa Cruz garter snake, T. a. atratus (Kennicott, 1860)
- Oregon garter snake, T. a. hydrophilus Fitch, 1936
- Diablo Range garter snake, T. a. zaxanthus Boundy, 1999
