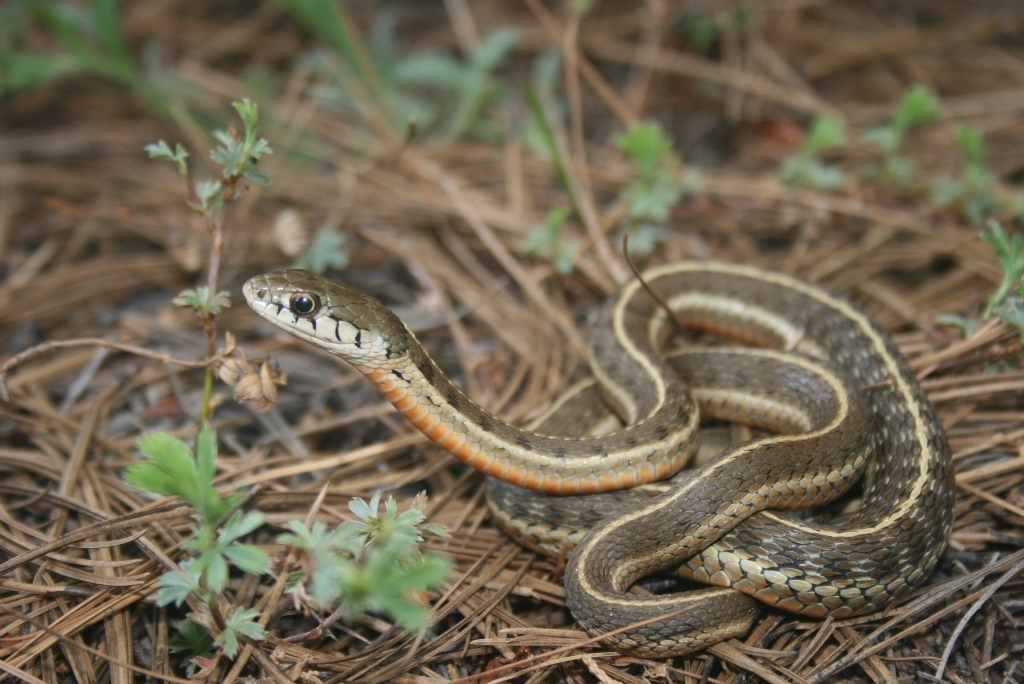

Conservation status
- Least Concern (IUCN 3.1)

Scientific classification
- Kingdom: Animalia
- Phylum: Chordata
- Class: Reptilia
- Order: Squamata
- Suborder: Serpentes
- Family: Colubridae
- Genus: Thamnophis
- Species: T. errans

Binomial name
- Thamnophis errans H. M. Smith, 1942

= Mexican wandering garter snake =

Species of snake

The Mexican wandering garter snake (Thamnophis errans) is a species of snake of the family Colubridae. It is endemic to Mexico.

== Taxonomy ==
=== Classification ===
This snake was first described as species new to science in 1942. Subsequently, some authors have noted similarities between northern populations of the Mexican wandering garter snake and the southern subspecies of the western terrestrial garter snake (Thamnophis elegans vagrans), leading them to reclassify the former as another subspecies of the western terrestrial garter snake under the name Thamnophis elegans errans. However, a 280 km gap of uninhabitable low desert separates the ranges of the two populations. Additionally, even the closest populations of Mexican wandering and western terrestrial garter snakes are still morphologically separated by the number and arrangement of scales, as well as the color of the tongue. Presently, Thamnophis errans is considered a valid taxon.

== Distribution and habitat ==
The Mexican wandering garter snake is endemic to Mexico, where it has been found in the states of Chihuahua, Durango, Jalisco, Nayarit, and Zacatecas. It has an extensive linear range in the pine-oak forests of the Sierra Madre Occidental. When conditions allow, this species is widely dispersed within its range. It can be found near streams or ponds, but may also be found around rock piles or logs some distance from permanent water.
