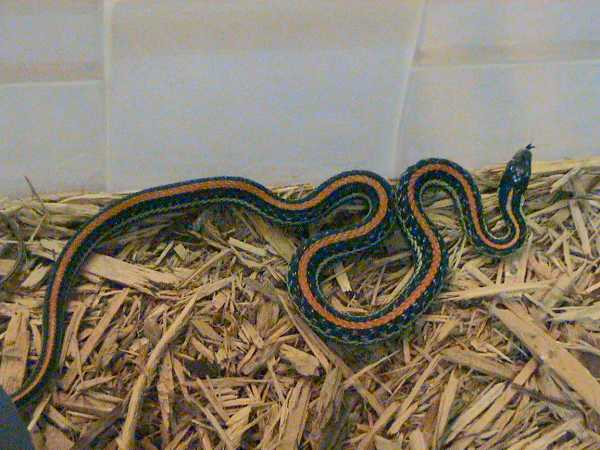
- Texas garter snake, Thamnophis sirtalis annectens

Scientific classification
- Kingdom: Animalia
- Phylum: Chordata
- Class: Reptilia
- Order: Squamata
- Suborder: Serpentes
- Family: Colubridae
- Genus: Thamnophis
- Species: T. sirtalis
- Subspecies: T. s. annectens

Trinomial name
- Thamnophis sirtalis annectens B.C. Brown, 1950

= Texas garter snake =

Subspecies of snake

The Texas garter snake (Thamnophis sirtalis annectens) is a subspecies of the common garter snake (T. sirtalis). The subspecies, which belongs to the subfamily Natricinae of the family Colubridae, is native to the western United States.

== Geographic range ==
The Texas garter snake is found predominantly in central Texas, with disjunct populations in southwestern Kansas and western Oklahoma.

== Habitat ==
The Texas garter snake is a terrestrial species. It is uncommon, even in its central Texas range, and seldom found in large numbers. It can be found in a wide range of habitats, but is usually close to a water source. It has typically been found in stream-side vegetation or in damp soil near bodies of water. It can be found under objects like old metal or wood, under ground, and in plants.

== Description ==
The Texas garter snake has a greenish-black back with a distinctive bright-orange or red stripe down the center, and yellowish stripes on either side of the body that extend through the second, third, and fourth rows of dorsal scales above the belly plates. Adults range in total length (including tail) from 38 to 71 cm (15 to 28 in).

== Defense ==
The Texas garter snake is generally not aggressive, although younger specimens have been known to strike when cornered. If handled, it will often flail about wildly to try to escape and release a foul-smelling musk from its cloaca.
