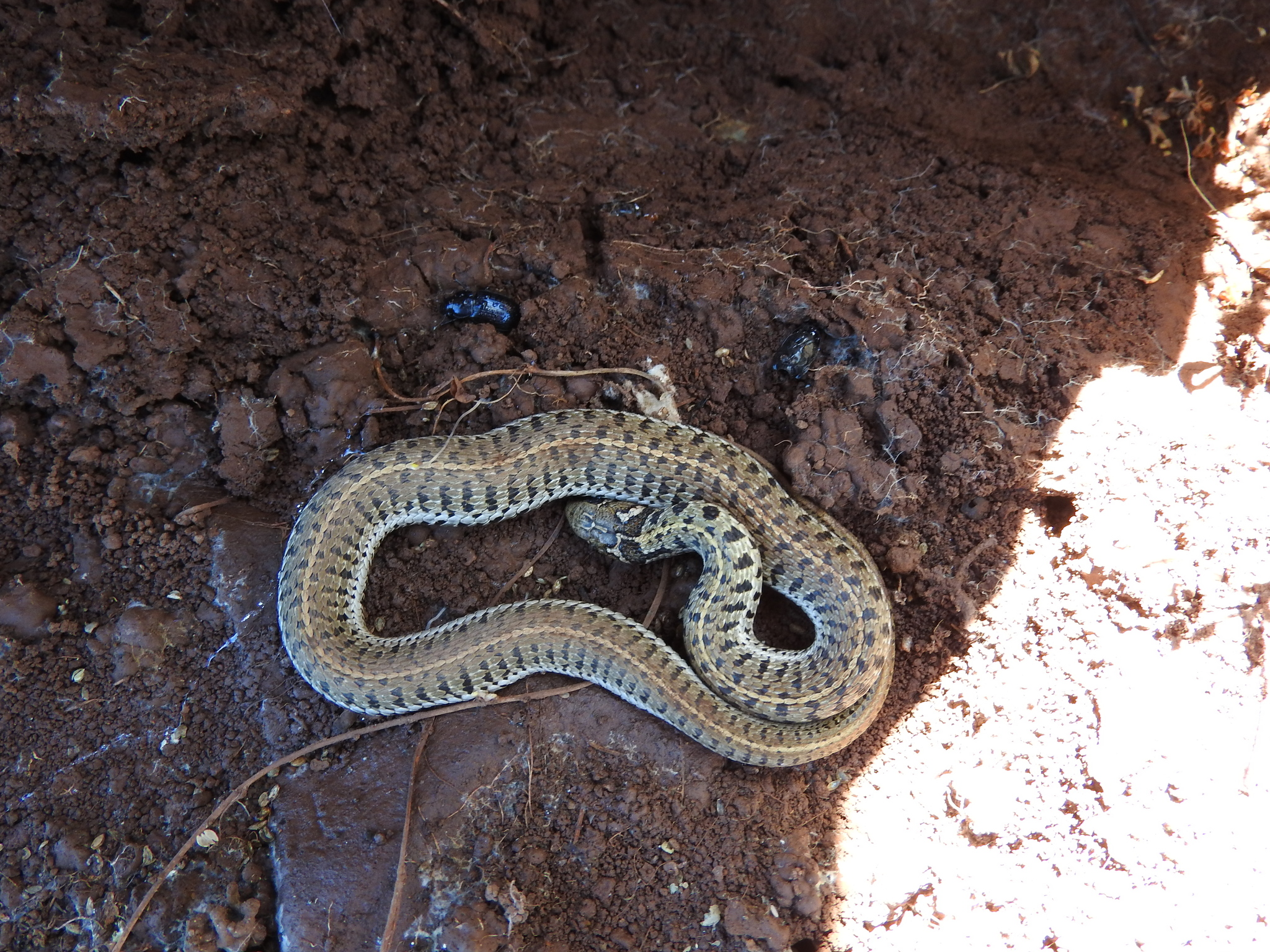

Conservation status
- Vulnerable (IUCN 3.1)

Scientific classification
- Kingdom: Animalia
- Phylum: Chordata
- Class: Reptilia
- Order: Squamata
- Suborder: Serpentes
- Family: Colubridae
- Genus: Thamnophis
- Species: T. scaliger

Binomial name
- Thamnophis scaliger (Jan, 1863)

= Short-tail Alpine garter snake =

Species of snake

The short-tail alpine garter snake (Thamnophis scaliger) is a species of snake of the family Colubridae. It is found in Mexico.
