= Thamnophis copei =

Conservation status
- Vulnerable (IUCN 3.1)

Scientific classification
- Kingdom: Animalia
- Phylum: Chordata
- Class: Reptilia
- Order: Squamata
- Suborder: Serpentes
- Family: Colubridae
- Genus: Thamnophis
- Species: T. copei

Binomial name
- Thamnophis copei Dugès, 1879
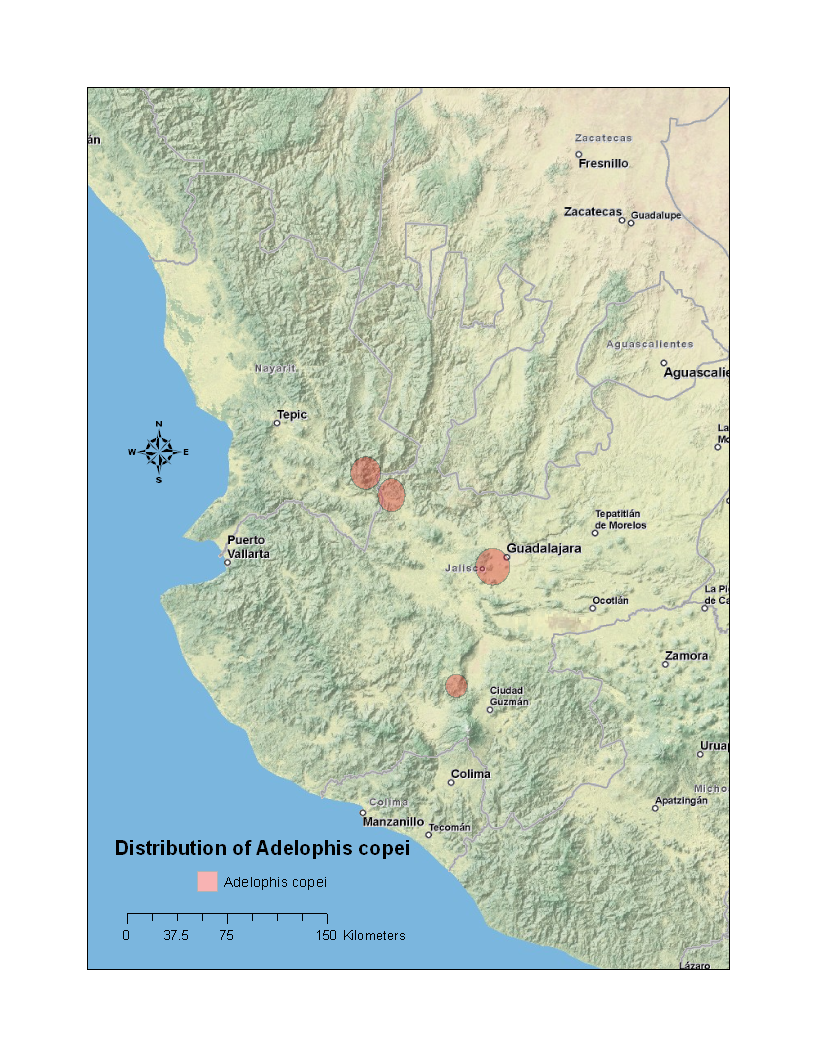
- Geographic range of Adelophis copei

Synonyms
- Adelophis copei Dugès in Cope, 1879; Storeria copei — Garman, 1883; Ischnognathus copii — Boulenger, 1893; Adelophis copei — Dunn, 1931

Species of snake

Thamnophis copei, Cope's mountain meadow snake, is a vulnerable species of snake in the family Colubridae. The species was originally described by Alfredo Dugès in 1897, and is endemic to Mexico. It is the type species of the genus Adelophis Dugès, 1879.

== Description ==
Thamnophis copei is a small and moderately slender snake that has a maximum total length (including tail) of 392 mm (15.4 in). The tail is about one fifth of the total length.

== Habitat and geographic range ==
Thamnophis copei lives in the wetlands of west-central Mexico, in such areas in the Mexican states of Jalisco, Michoacán, Guanajuato, Hidalgo, and northern Morelos.

== Conservation status ==
Thamnophis copei is threatened by habitat loss due to agriculture and human settlement. Mexico has placed national laws protecting the species, and the species is being researched for more ways to protect it. It is protected in the Sierra Los Huicholes reserve.
