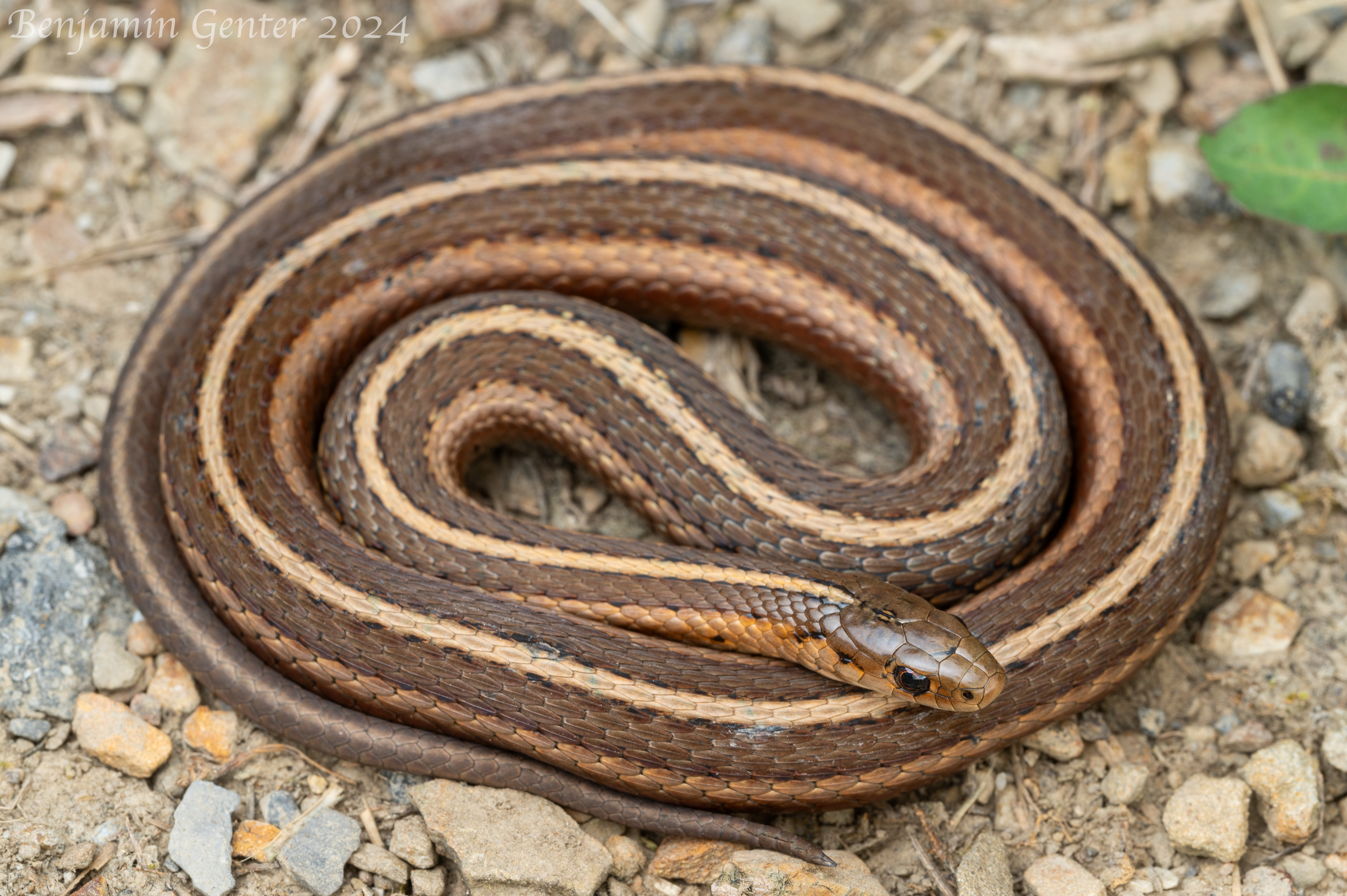

Conservation status
- Least Concern (IUCN 3.1)

- Apparently Secure (NatureServe)

Scientific classification
- Kingdom: Animalia
- Phylum: Chordata
- Class: Reptilia
- Order: Squamata
- Suborder: Serpentes
- Family: Colubridae
- Genus: Thamnophis
- Species: T. brachystoma

Binomial name
- Thamnophis brachystoma (Cope, 1892)

Synonyms
- Eutaenia brachystoma Cope, 1892; Thamnophis brachystoma — A.G. Smith, 1945

= Shorthead garter snake =

Species of snake

Thamnophis brachystoma, commonly known as the shorthead garter snake or short-headed gartersnake, is a small species of snake in the subfamily Natricinae of the family Colubridae. The species is native to the northeastern United States.

== Etymology ==
The specific name brachystoma comes from the Greek words brachy, meaning short, and stoma, meaning mouth.

== Description ==
Thamnophis brachystoma is a small species of snake, with a total length (including tail) of 254–559 mm (10.0–22.0 in). There is no apparent distinction between the body and head. Unlike Thamnophis sirtalis, there are no black spots between stripes in T. brachystoma. Dorsal coloration tends to be olive or olive-green with three (1 dorsal, 2 lateral) beige to yellow stripes running the length of the body. There is a distinct sexual dimorphism in this species with females being larger than males.

== Distribution and habitat ==
Thamnophis brachystoma is found in small pockets in northwestern Pennsylvania and southwestern New York. Outside of its natural range, there is an introduced population in Pittsburgh in southwestern Pennsylvania, as well as Youngstown, Mahoning County, Ohio.

The shorthead garter snake is commonly found in old fields and meadows, but can occasionally be found in wooded areas. It is almost always found within several hundred meters of a field. It is believed that on sunny days it will be openly basking; however, when a population study was conducted, it was almost invariably found under objects such as wood and rocks. Individuals were only encountered in the open on cloudy days.

== Ecology and behavior ==
Thamnophis brachystoma is slow to bite would be handlers, but will readily expel musk and feces from the cloaca. Shorthead garter snakes can commonly be found near one another under cover objects, with no apparent correlation to seasonality or breeding cycles.

=== Diet ===
In the wild, T. brachystoma feeds exclusively on earthworms. However, in captivity shorthead garter snakes may consume other food items such as leeches, salamanders, frogs, and fish. Prior to the introduction of non-native earthworms to North America, T. brachystoma would have primarily fed on native earthworms that were restricted to the unglaciated Allegheny Plateau.

=== Reproduction ===
Reproduction in T. brachystoma occurs in spring shortly after emerging from the hibernacula. Females generally emerge with ovarian follicles already well developed. Females in New York breed every other year while females in Pennsylvania breed annually. Males use stored sperm for breeding. The testes are small after emergence, reaching full size by midsummer. After this point, sperm will be stored for later use in the spring. T. brachystoma is believed to be viviparous, with experiments showing a transfer of amino acids between mother and offspring.
