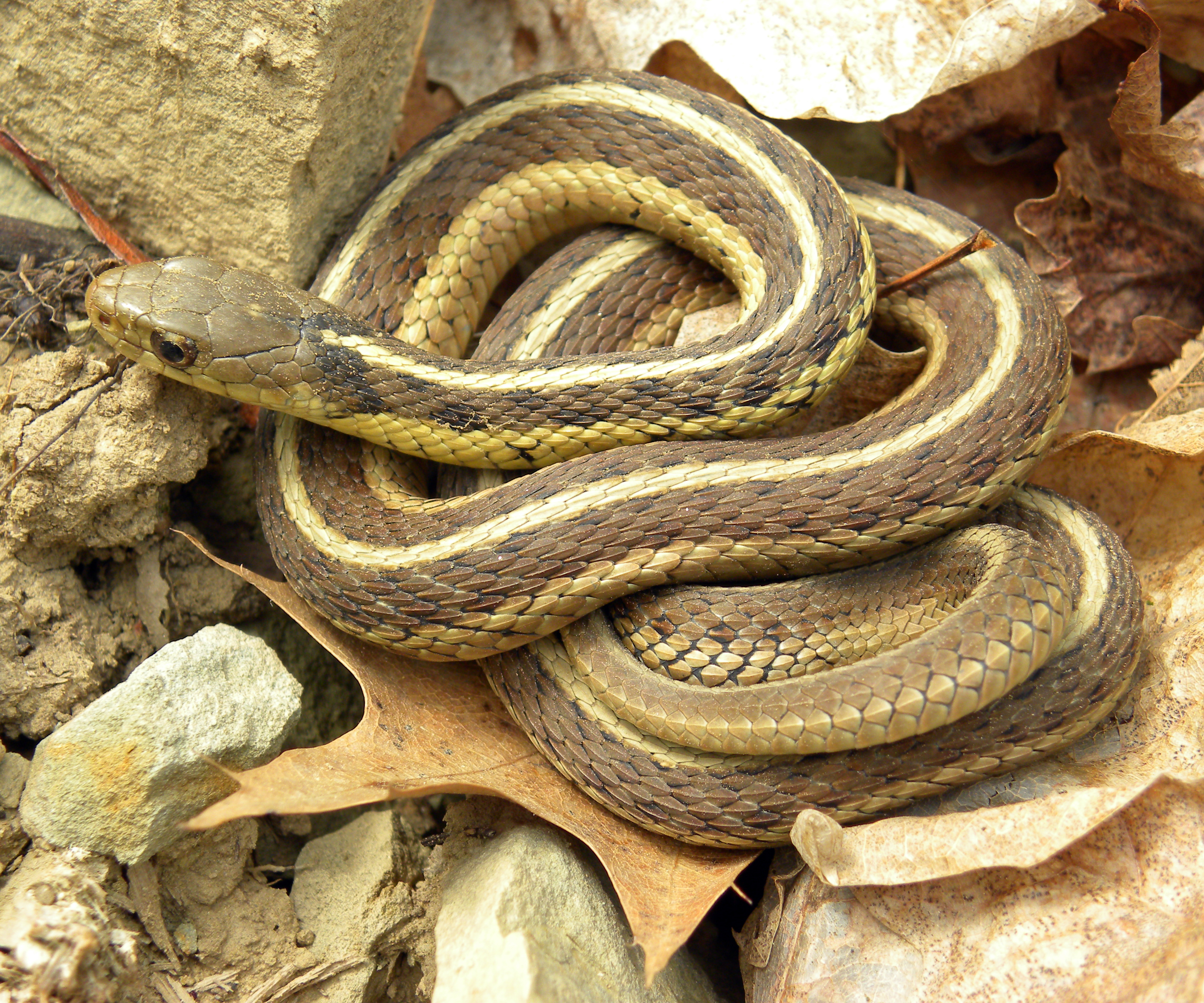
- The eastern garter snake (Thamnophis sirtalis sirtalis)

Scientific classification
- Kingdom: Animalia
- Phylum: Chordata
- Class: Reptilia
- Order: Squamata
- Suborder: Serpentes
- Family: Colubridae
- Subfamily: Natricinae
- Genus: Thamnophis; Fitzinger, 1843

Species
- 35, see text
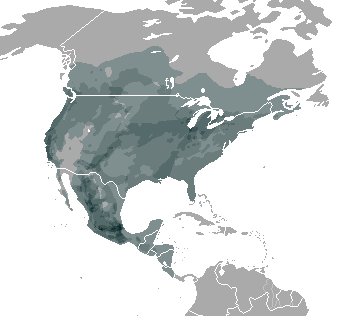
- Thamnophis distribution (note: excludes some species like Thamnophis marcianus from southwestern North America)

Synonyms
- List: Atomarchus; Chilopoma; Eutaenia; Eutainia; Phamnovis; Prymnomiodon; Stypocemus; Tropidonote; Tropidonotus

= Garter snake =

Common name for snakes of the genus Thamnophis

Garter snake is the common name for small to medium-sized snakes belonging to the genus Thamnophis in the family Colubridae. They are native to North and Central America, ranging from central Canada in the north to Costa Rica in the south.

With about 37 recognized species and 52 subspecies, garter snakes are highly variable in appearance; generally, they have large round eyes with rounded pupils, a slender build, keeled scales (appearing 'raised'), and a pattern of longitudinal stripes that may or may not include spots (although some have no stripes at all). Certain subspecies have stripes of blue, yellow, or red, mixed with black tops and beige-tan underbelly markings. They also vary significantly in total length, from 18 to 51 in (46 to 130 cm).

With no real consensus on the classification of the species of Thamnophis, disagreements between taxonomists and disputed sources (such as field guides) are common. One area of debate, for example, is whether two specific types of snake are separate species, or subspecies of the same. Garter snakes are closely related to the genus Nerodia (water snakes), with some species having been moved back and forth between genera.

As garter snakes may retain toxins from their amphibian prey in their liver, they are one of the few species of snakes in the world that can be both venomous and poisonous.

== Taxonomy ==
The first garter snake to be scientifically described was the eastern garter snake (now Thamnophis sirtalis sirtalis), by zoologist and taxonomist Carl Linnaeus in 1758. The genus Thamnophis was described by Leopold Fitzinger in 1843 as the genus for the garter snakes and ribbon snakes. Many snakes previously identified as their own genera or species have been reclassified as species or subspecies in Thamnophis. The Reptile Database currently recognised 37 species in the genus, some with several subspecies.

== Distribution and habitat ==
Native to North and Central America, species in the genus Thamnophis can be found in all of the lower 48 United States, and all of the Canadian provinces. They are found from the subarctic plains of west-central Canada east through Ontario and Quebec; from Atlantic Canada and south to Florida, across the southern and central U.S. into the arid regions of the southwest and Mexico, Guatemala and south to the neotropics and Costa Rica.

Garter snakes are not originally native to the eastern Canadian island of Newfoundland, but have been breeding there in the wild and gradually spreading since at least 2010. It is unknown how they reached the island, probably accidentally via hay shipments or as escaped pets.

Their wide distribution is due to their varied diets and adaptability to different habitats, with varying proximity to water. However, in the western part of North America these snakes are more aquatic than in the eastern portion. Garter snakes live in a variety of habitats, including forests, woodlands, fields, grasslands and lawns, but never far from water, often an adjacent wetland, stream or pond. This reflects the fact that amphibians are a large part of their diet. Garter snakes are often found near small ponds with tall weeds. Garter snakes prefer habitats that offer mixed canopy cover, allowing for proper thermoregulation and reducing the risk of overheating.

== Behavior ==
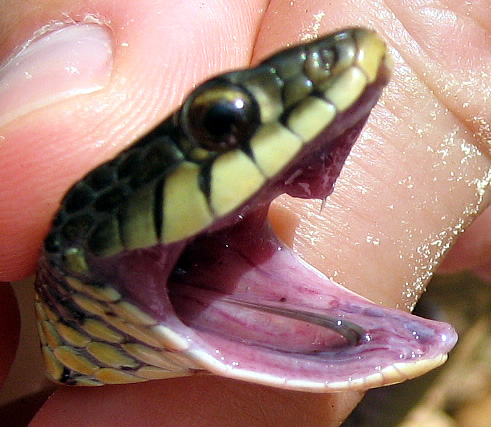
The posterior tooth of a garter snake

Garter snakes have complex pheromonal communication systems. They can find other snakes by following their pheromone-scented trails. Male and female skin pheromones are so different as to be immediately distinguishable. However, male garter snakes sometimes produce both male and female pheromones. During the mating season, this ability fools other males into attempting to mate with them. This causes the transfer of heat to them in kleptothermy, which is an advantage immediately after hibernation, allowing them to become more active. Male snakes giving off both male and female pheromones have been shown to garner more copulations than normal males in the mating balls that form at the den when females enter the mating melee. A snake hatch can include as many as 57 young.

Garter snakes use the vomeronasal organ to communicate via pheromones through tongue flicking, which gathers chemical cues in the environment. Upon entering the lumen of the organ, the chemical molecules will come into contact with the sensory cells, which are attached to the neurosensory epithelium of the vomeronasal organ.

If disturbed, a garter snake may coil and strike, but it typically hides its head and flails its tail. These snakes will also discharge a malodorous, musky-scented secretion from a gland near the cloaca. This secretion from North American garter snakes contains seven highly odoriferous volatile components: acetic, propanoic, 2-methylpropanoic, butanoic, and 3-methylbutanoic acids; and trimethylamine, and 2-piperidone. They often use these techniques to escape when ensnared by a predator. They will also slither into the water to escape a predator on land. Hawks, crows, egrets, herons, cranes, raccoons, otters and other snake species (such as coral snakes and kingsnakes) will eat garter snakes, with even shrews and frogs eating the juveniles.

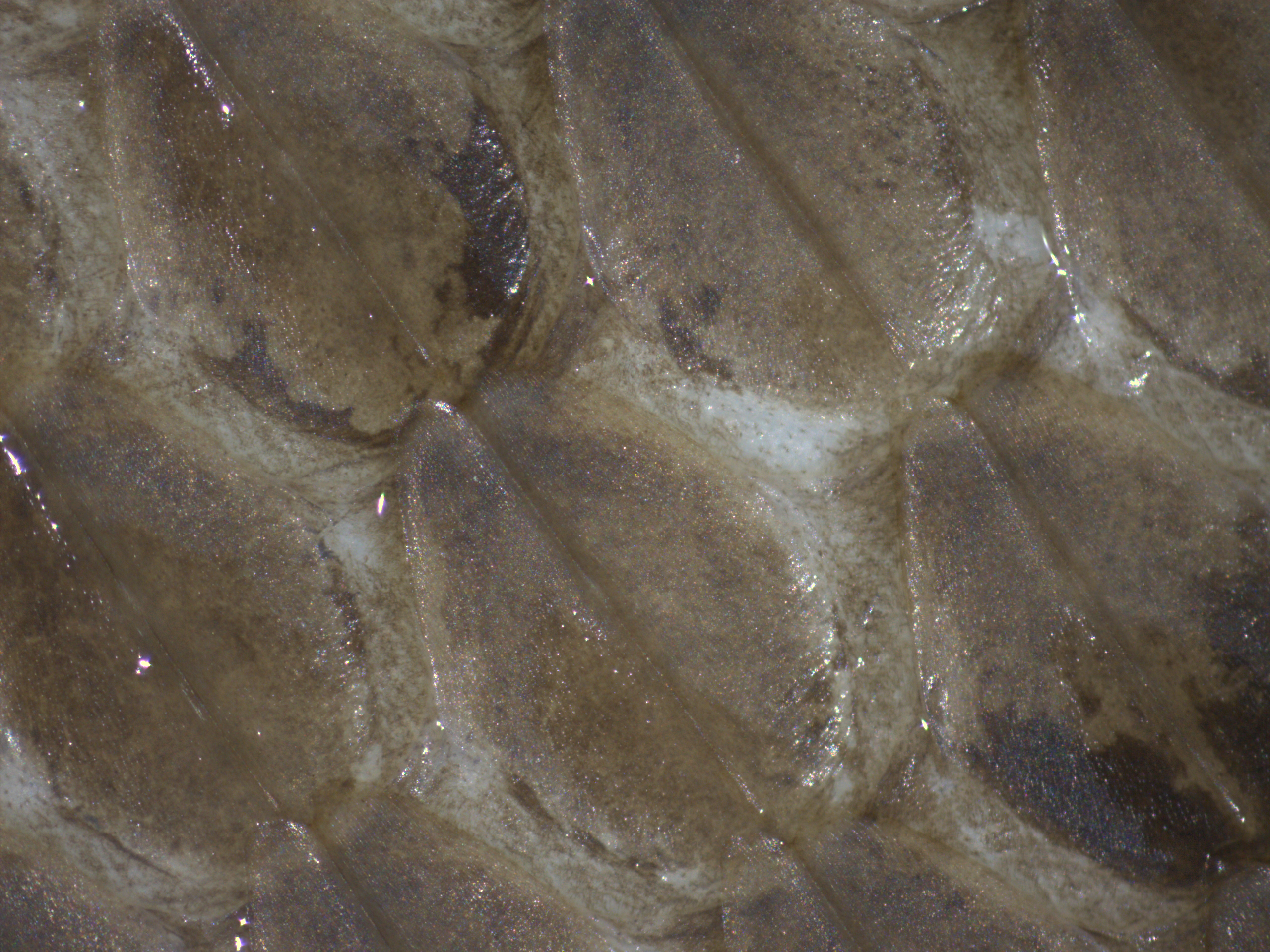
Close up of the scales on the back of the common garter snake

Being heterothermic, like all reptiles, garter snakes bask in the sun to regulate their body temperature. During brumation (the reptile equivalent of hibernation), garter snakes typically occupy large communal sites called hibernacula. These snakes will migrate large distances to brumate.

=== Social behavior ===
A long-term study by the Ontario Ministry of Transportation has shed light on the social behavior of Butler's garter snakes. The study, conducted in a 250-hectare area near Windsor, Canada, tracked over 3,000 individual snakes over a 12-year period. The findings challenge previous assumptions about solitary snake behavior and suggest that these snakes form social groups and communities. The study revealed that Butler's garter snakes do not wander randomly but instead tend to associate with specific groups of snakes. These groups typically consist of three to four individuals, with some larger groups reaching up to 46 snakes.

=== Diet ===
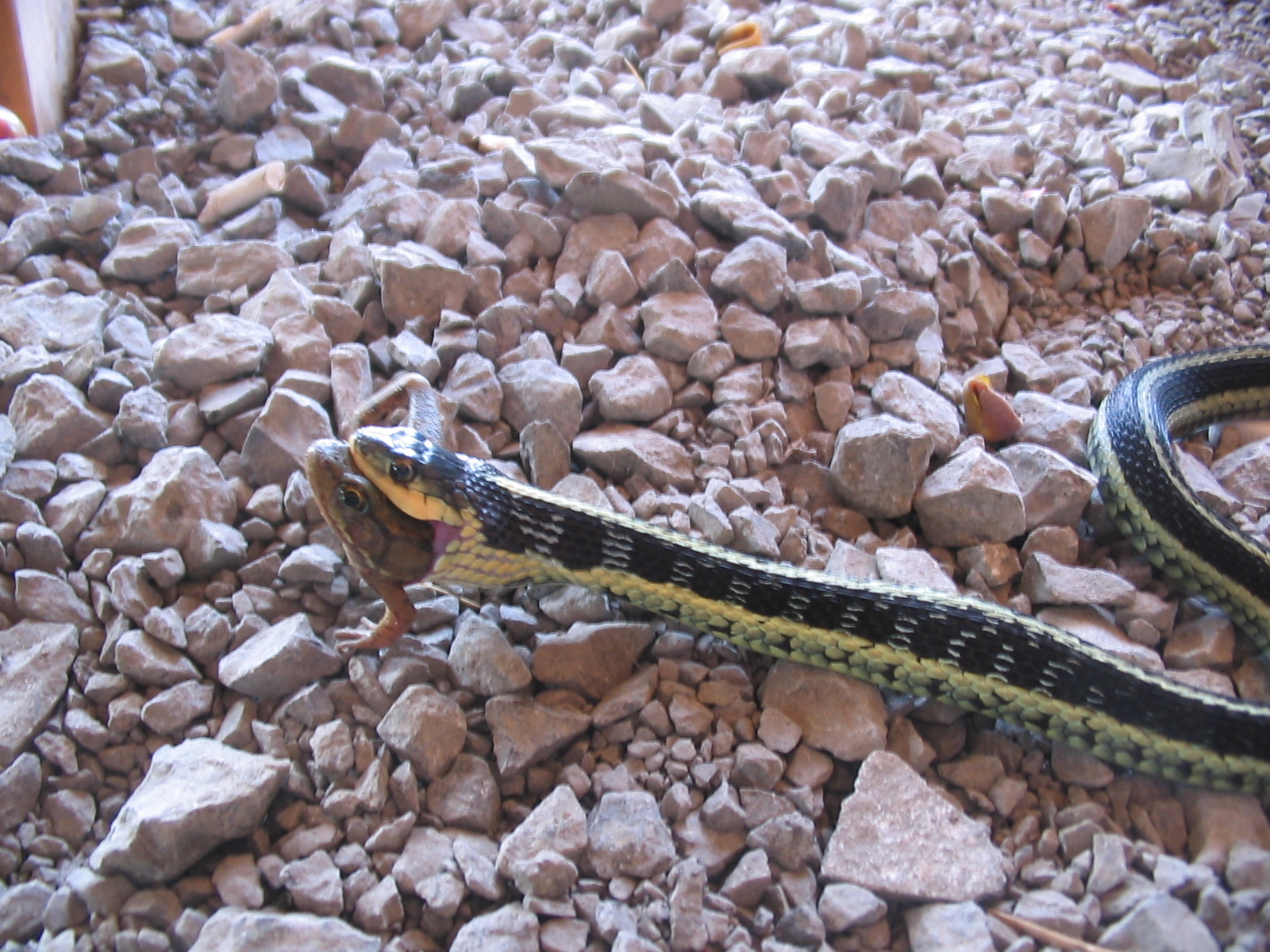
Eating a frog

Garter snakes, like all snakes, are carnivorous. Their diet consists of almost any creature they are capable of overpowering: slugs, earthworms (nightcrawlers, as redworms are toxic to garter snakes), leeches, lizards, amphibians (including frog eggs), minnows, and rodents. When living near water, they eat other aquatic animals. The ribbon snake (Thamnophis saurita) in particular favors frogs (including tadpoles), readily eating them despite their strong chemical defenses. Food is swallowed whole. Garter snakes often adapt to eating whatever they can find and whenever they can find it because food can be either scarce or abundant. Although they feed mostly on live animals they will sometimes eat eggs.

=== Venom ===
Garter snakes were long thought to be non-venomous, but discoveries in the early 2000s revealed that they produce a neurotoxic venom. Despite this, garter snakes cannot seriously injure or kill humans with the small amounts of comparatively mild venom they produce and they also lack an effective means of delivering it. In a few cases, some swelling and bruising has been reported. They do have enlarged teeth in the back of their mouths but their gums are significantly larger and the secretions of their Duvernoy's gland are only mildly toxic.

Evidence suggests that garter snake and newt populations share an evolutionary link in their tetrodotoxin resistance levels, implying co-evolution between predator and prey. Garter snakes feeding on toxic newts can also retain those toxins in their liver for weeks, making those snakes poisonous as well as venomous.

== Conservation status ==
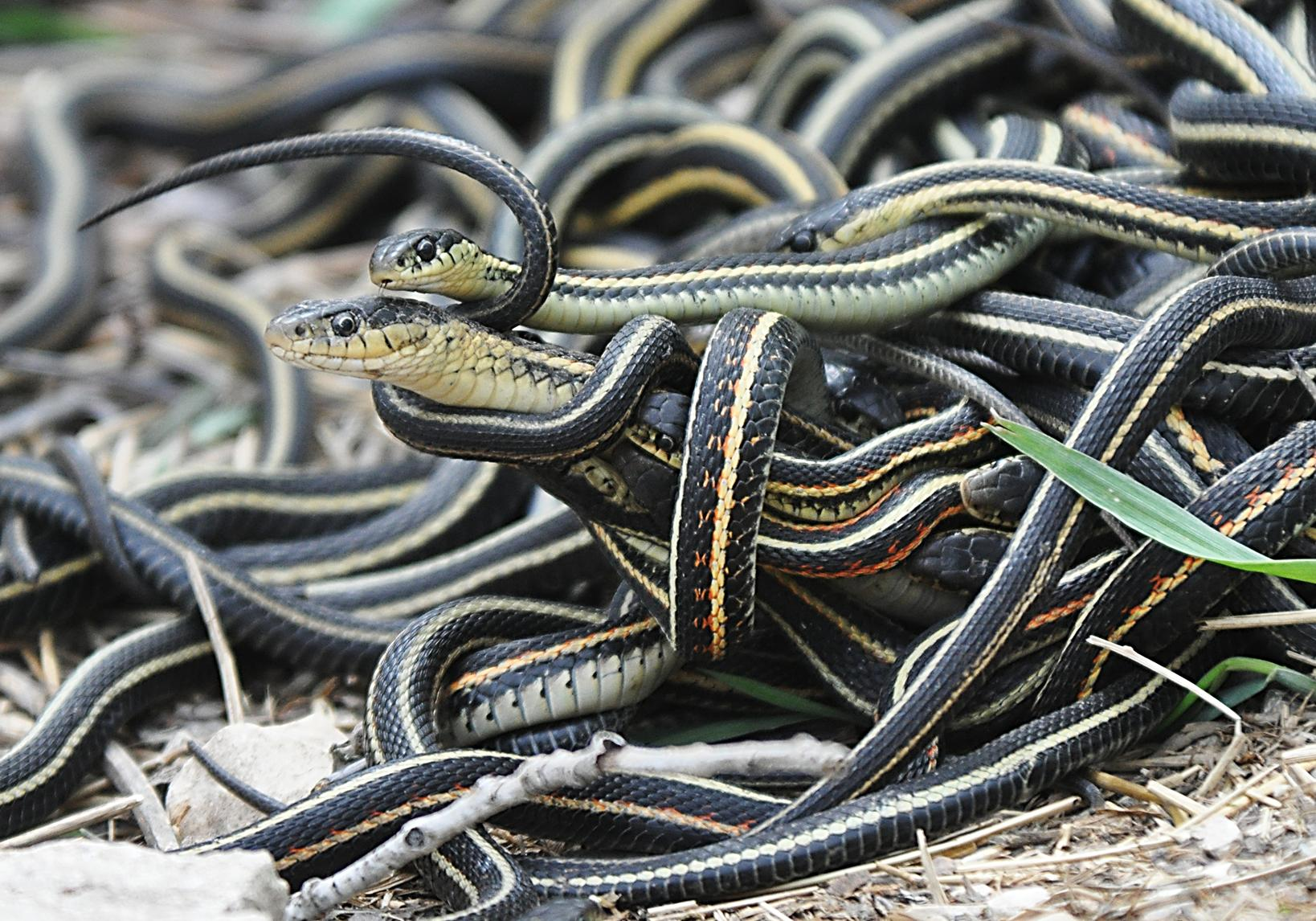
A mating ball

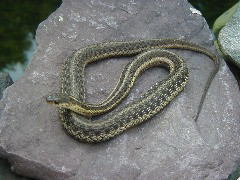
A young garter snake

Despite the decline in their population from collection as pets (especially in the more northerly regions, in which large groups are collected at hibernation), pollution of aquatic areas, and the introduction of American bullfrogs as potential predators, garter snakes are still some of the most commonly found reptiles in much of their ranges. The San Francisco garter snake (Thamnophis sirtalis tetrataenia), however, has been on the endangered list since 1969. Predation by crayfish has also been responsible for the decline of the narrow-headed garter snake (Thamnophis rufipunctatus). Many breeders have bred all species of garter snakes, making it a popular breed.

== Species and subspecies ==
Arranged alphabetically by scientific name:

Image	Subspecies	Common name	Subspecies	Distribution
	Thamnophis ahumadai C. Grünwald, Mendoza-Portilla, A. Grünwald, Montaño-Ruvalcaba, Franz-Chávez, García-Vázquez, & Reyes-Velasco, 2024			Jalisco Mountain, Mexico
	Thamnophis atratus (Kennicott, 1860)	Aquatic garter snake	Santa Cruz garter snake, T. a. atratus (Kennicott, 1860); Oregon garter snake, T. a. hydrophilus Fitch, 1936; Diablo Range garter snake, T. a. zaxanthus Boundy, 1999	coast of Oregon and California.
	Thamnophis bogerti Rossman & Burbrink, 2005	Bogert's garter snake		Oaxaca, Mexico
	Thamnophis brachystoma (Cope, 1892)	Shorthead garter snake		northwestern Pennsylvania and southwestern New York.
	Thamnophis butleri (Cope, 1889)	Butler's garter snake		northwestern Ohio, northeastern Indiana, the eastern portion of the Lower Peninsula of Michigan, and the adjacent extreme southern tip of Ontario, Canada.
	Thamnophis chrysocephalus (Cope, 1885)	Golden head garter snake		Mexico.
	Thamnophis conanti Rossman & Burbrink, 2005	Conant's garter snake		Puebla and Veracruz, Mexico.
	Thamnophis copei Dugès, 1879	Cope's mountain meadow garter snake		Mexico.
	Thamnophis couchii (Kennicott, 1859)	Sierra garter snake		California and Oregon in the United States
	Thamnophis cyrtopsis (Kennicott, 1860)	Blackneck garter snake	Western blackneck garter snake, T. c. cyrtopsis (Kennicott, 1860); Eastern blackneck garter snake, T. c. ocellatus (Cope, 1880); Tropical blackneck garter snake, T. c. collaris (Jan, 1863)	southwestern United States, Mexico and Guatemala
	Thamnophis elegans (Baird & Girard, 1853)	Western terrestrial garter snake	Arizona garter snake, T. e. arizonae W. Tanner & Lowe, 1989; Mountain garter snake, T. e. elegans (Baird & Girard, 1853); San Pedro Mártir garter snake, T. e. hueyi Van Denburgh & Slevin, 1923; Coastal garter snake, T. e. terrestris Fox, 1951; Wandering garter snake, T. e. vagrans (Baird & Girard, 1853); Upper Basin garter snake, T. e. vascotanneri W. Tanner & Lowe, 1989	central British Columbia, central Alberta, and southwestern Manitoba in Canada, central United States
	Thamnophis eques (Reuss, 1834)	Mexican garter snake	Mexican garter snake, T. e. eques (Reuss, 1834); Laguna Totolcingo garter snake, T. e. carmenensis Conant, 2003; T. e. cuitzeoensis Conant, 2003; T. e. diluvialis Conant, 2003; T. e. insperatus Conant, 2003; Northern Mexican garter snake, T. e. megalops (Kennicott, 1860); T. e. obscurus Conant, 2003; T. e. patzcuaroensis Conant, 2003; T. e. scotti Conant, 2003; T. e. virgatenuis Conant, 1963	Mexico and in the United States (Arizona and New Mexico).
	Thamnophis errans H. M. Smith, 1942	Mexican wandering garter snake		Chihuahua, Durango, Jalisco, Nayarit, and Zacatecas States of Mexico.
	Thamnophis exsul Rossman, 1969	Montane garter snake		Mexico.
	Thamnophis foxi Rossman & Blaney, 1968	Fox's mountain meadow snake		Mexico.
	Thamnophis fulvus (Bocourt, 1893)	Highland garter snake		Mexico, Guatemala, Honduras and El Salvador.
	Thamnophis gigas Fitch, 1940	Giant garter snake		central California.
	Thamnophis godmani (Günther, 1894)	Godman's garter snake		southern Mexico
	Thamnophis hammondii (Kennicott, 1860)	Two-striped garter snake		central California to Baja California, Mexico
	Thamnophis lineriRossman & Burbrink, 2005	Liner's garter snake		Mexico.
	Thamnophis marcianus (Baird & Girard, 1853)	Checkered garter snake	T. m. marcianus (Baird & Girard, 1853); T. m. praeocularis (Bocourt, 1892); T. m. bovalli (Dunn, 1940)	southwestern United States, Mexico, and Central America.
	Thamnophis melanogaster (Peters, 1864)	Blackbelly garter snake	Gray blackbelly garter snake, T. m. canescens H.M. Smith, 1942; Chihuahuan blackbelly garter snake, T. m. chihuahuanensis W. Tanner, 1959; Lined blackbelly garter snake, T. m. linearis H.M. Smith, Nixon & P.W. Smith, 1950; Mexican blackbelly garter snake, T. m. melanogaster (W. Peters, 1864)	Mexico.
	Thamnophis mendax Walker, 1955	Tamaulipan montane garter snake		Mexico.
	Thamnophis nigronuchalis Thompson, 1957	Southern Durango spotted garter snake		Durango, Mexico.
	Thamnophis ordinoides (Baird & Girard, 1852)	Northwestern garter snake		California, Oregon, and Washington; in Canada, it is found in British Columbia
	Thamnophis postremus Smith, 1942	Tepalcatepec Valley garter snake		Mexico.
	Thamnophis proximus (Say, 1823)	Western ribbon snake	Chiapas Highlands ribbon snake, T. p. alpinus Rossman, 1963; Arid land ribbon snake, T. p. diabolicus Rossman, 1963; Gulf Coast ribbon snake, T. p. orarius Rossman, 1963; Orangestripe ribbon snake or western ribbon snake T. p. proximus (Say, 1823); Redstripe ribbon snake, T. p. rubrilineatus Rossman, 1963; Mexican ribbon snake, T. p. rutiloris (Cope, 1885)	western United States, Mexico, and Central America
	Thamnophis pulchrilatus (Cope, 1885)	Yellow-throated garter snake		Mexico.
	Thamnophis radix (Baird & Girard, 1853)	Plains garter snake		central United States as far north as Canada and as far south as Texas.
	Thamnophis rossmani Conant, 2000	Rossman's garter snake		Mexico.
	Thamnophis rufipunctatus (Cope, 1875)	Narrow-headed garter snake		Arizona and New Mexico, and in the Mexican states of Sonora, Chihuahua and Durango
	Thamnophis saurita (Linnaeus, 1766)	Ribbon snake	Bluestripe ribbon snake, T. s. nitae Rossman, 1963; Southern ribbon snake, T. s. sackenii (Kennicott, 1859); Eastern ribbon snake, T. s. saurita (Linnaeus, 1766); Northern ribbon snake, T. s. septentrionalis Rossman, 1963	Eastern North America
	Thamnophis scalaris (Cope, 1861)	Longtail alpine garter snake		Mexico.
	Thamnophis scaliger (Jan, 1863)	Short-tail alpine garter snake		Mexico.
	Thamnophis sirtalis (Linnaeus, 1758)	Common garter snake	Texas garter snake, T. s. annectens Brown, 1950; Red-spotted garter snake, T. s. concinnus (Hallowell, 1852); New Mexico garter snake, T. s. dorsalis (Baird & Girard, 1853); valley garter snake, T. s. fitchi Fox, 1951; California red-sided garter snake, T. s. infernalis (Blainville, 1835); T. s. lowei W. Tanner, 1988; Maritime garter snake, T. s. pallidulus Allen, 1899; Red-sided garter snake, T. s. parietalis (Say, 1823); Puget Sound garter snake, T. s. pickeringii (Baird & Girard, 1853); Blue-striped garter snake, T. s. similis Rossman, 1965; Eastern garter snake, T. s. sirtalis (Linnaeus, 1758); Chicago garter snake, T. s. semifasciatus (Cope, 1892); San Francisco garter snake, T. s. tetrataenia (Cope, 1875)	North America
	Thamnophis sumichrasti (Cope, 1866)	Sumichrast's garter snake		Mexico.
	Thamnophis unilabialis W. Tanner, 1985	Madrean narrow-headed garter snake		Mexico.
	Thamnophis validus (Kennicott, 1860)	West Coast garter snake	Mexican Pacific Lowlands garter snake, T. v. celaeno (Cope, 1860); T. v. isabellae (Conant, 1953); T. v. thamnophisoides (Conant, 1961); T. v. validus (Kennicott, 1860)	Mexico.

In the above list, a binomial authority or a trinomial authority in parentheses indicates that the species or subspecies was originally described in a genus other than Thamnophis.

== See also ==
- Narcisse Snake Dens
- List of snakes, overview of all snake families and genera
