= Thamnophis lineri =

Scientific classification
- Kingdom: Animalia
- Phylum: Chordata
- Class: Reptilia
- Order: Squamata
- Suborder: Serpentes
- Family: Colubridae
- Genus: Thamnophis
- Species: T. lineri

Binomial name
- Thamnophis lineri Rossman & Burbrink, 2005

Species of snake

Thamnophis lineri, also known commonly as Liner's garter snake and víbora de aqua in Mexican Spanish, is a species of snake in the subfamily Natricinae of the family Colubridae. The species is endemic to Mexico.

== Etymology ==
The specific name lineri is in honor of the American herpetologist Ernest A. Liner (1925–2010).

== Geographic range ==
T. lineri is found only in the Mexican state of Oaxaca.

== Habitat ==
The preferred habitats of T. lineri are pine-oak forest and pine-oak-madroño forest at elevations of 2,700 m (8,900 ft) and higher.

== Reproduction ==
T. lineri is viviparous.
