= Godman's garter snake =

Conservation status
- Least Concern (IUCN 3.1)

Scientific classification
- Kingdom: Animalia
- Phylum: Chordata
- Class: Reptilia
- Order: Squamata
- Suborder: Serpentes
- Family: Colubridae
- Genus: Thamnophis
- Species: T. godmani

Binomial name
- Thamnophis godmani (Günther, 1894)

Synonyms
- Tropidonotus godmani Günther, 1894; Eutaenia godmani — Cope, 1900; Thamnophis scalaris godmani — H.M. Smith, 1942; Thamnophis godmani — Rossman in Varkey, 1979

Species of snake

Godman's garter snake (Thamnophis godmani) is a species of snake in the family Colubridae. The species is endemic to southern Mexico, and was first described by Albert Günther in 1894.

== Etymology ==
The specific name godmani is in honor of the British naturalist Frederick DuCane Godman.

== Geographic range ==
T. godmani is found in the Mexican states of Guerrero, Oaxaca, Puebla, and Veracruz.

== Habitat ==
The preferred natural habitats of T. godmani are forest and freshwater wetlands.

== Behavior ==
A terrestrial species, T. godmani shelters under rocks and logs.

== Reproduction ==
The mode of reproduction of T. godmani has been described as viviparous and as ovoviviparous.
