= Tamaulipan montane garter snake =

Conservation status
- Endangered (IUCN 3.1)

Scientific classification
- Kingdom: Animalia
- Phylum: Chordata
- Class: Reptilia
- Order: Squamata
- Suborder: Serpentes
- Family: Colubridae
- Genus: Thamnophis
- Species: T. mendax

Binomial name
- Thamnophis mendax Walker, 1955

Species of snake

The Tamaulipan montane garter snake (Thamnophis mendax) is a species of snake of the family Colubridae. It is endemic to the Sierra Madre Oriental of Tamaulipas, Mexico, where it has been found between 1,100 and 1,600 meters elevation.
