= Southern Durango spotted garter snake =

Conservation status
- Data Deficient (IUCN 3.1)

Scientific classification
- Kingdom: Animalia
- Phylum: Chordata
- Class: Reptilia
- Order: Squamata
- Suborder: Serpentes
- Family: Colubridae
- Genus: Thamnophis
- Species: T. nigronuchalis

Binomial name
- Thamnophis nigronuchalis Thompson, 1957

Species of snake

The Southern Durango spotted garter snake (Thamnophis nigronuchalis) is a species of snake of the family Colubridae. It is endemic to the state of Durango, Mexico.

== Description ==
This is a heavy-bodied, medium sized garter snake. It has an oval-shaped head with two supralabial scales, two preocular scales, and a distinct black blotch on the dorsal surface of its neck. It has 149-165 ventral and 63-70 caudal scales. Ventral scales are heavily pigmented, often forming an irregular black stripe. The dorsal pattern consists of rufous-colored spots outlined in black in 5-10 rows, with no dorsal or lateral stripes.

== Taxonomy ==
=== Classification ===
While it is now considered a valid species, some authorities have classified this snake as a subspecies of the narrow-headed garter snake under the name Thamnophis rufipunctatus nigronuchalis.

=== Etymology ===
The specific name nigronuchalis references the Latin word nigro meaning black, and nuchal meaning of the nape, and is derived from the black neck patch characteristic of the species.

== Distribution and habitat ==
This snake is endemic to Durango state in Mexico, where it is found in wet meadows and riparian areas at altitudes of 8500–9000 feet. It appears to be restricted to high elevation drainage basins of the Sierra Madre Occidental.

== Diet ==
This species has been documented to eat earthworms and amphibians, including Rana pipiens and Hyla species.
