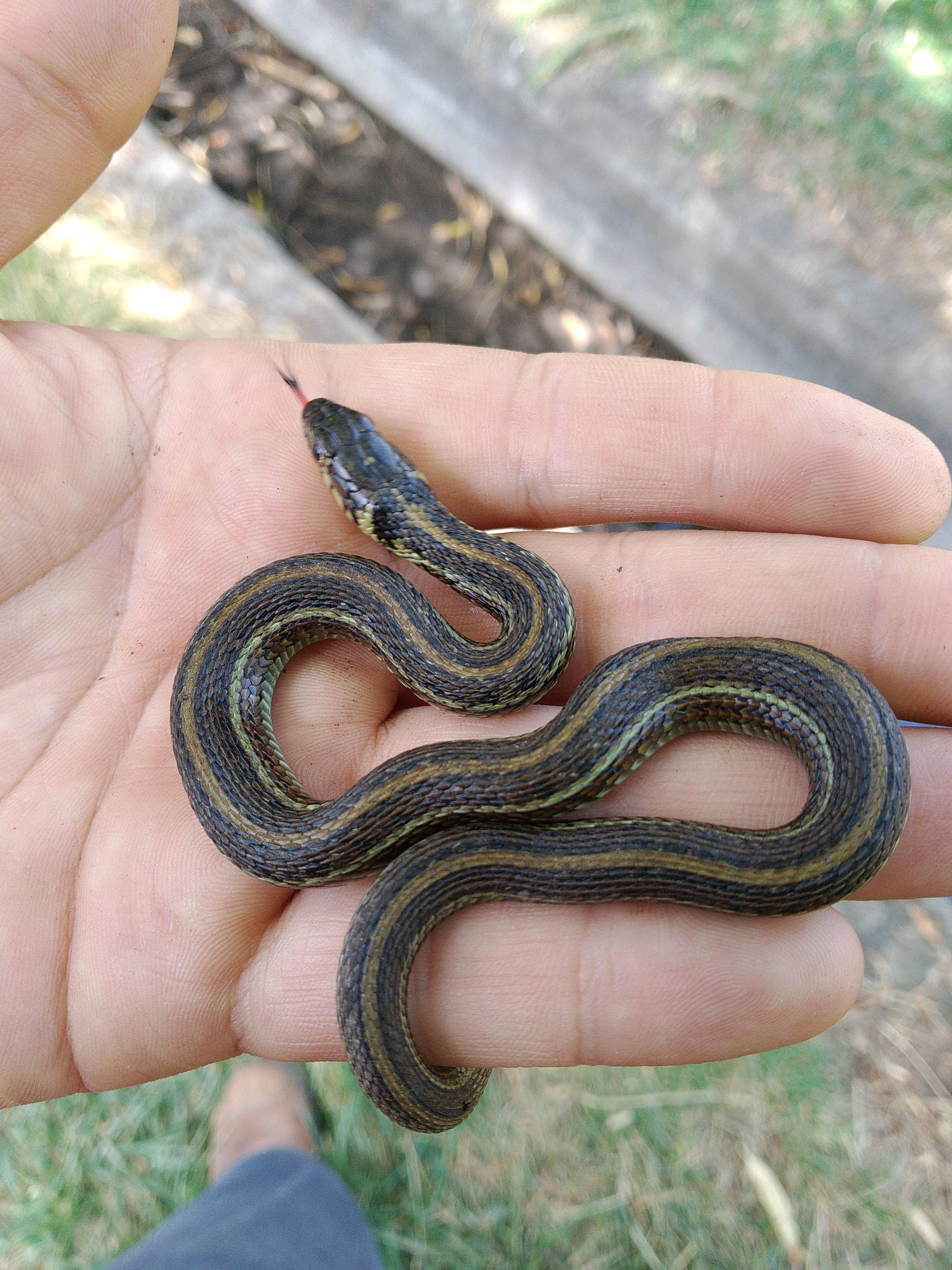

Conservation status
- Least Concern (IUCN 3.1)

Scientific classification
- Kingdom: Animalia
- Phylum: Chordata
- Class: Reptilia
- Order: Squamata
- Suborder: Serpentes
- Family: Colubridae
- Genus: Thamnophis
- Species: T. eques

Binomial name
- Thamnophis eques (Reuss, 1834)
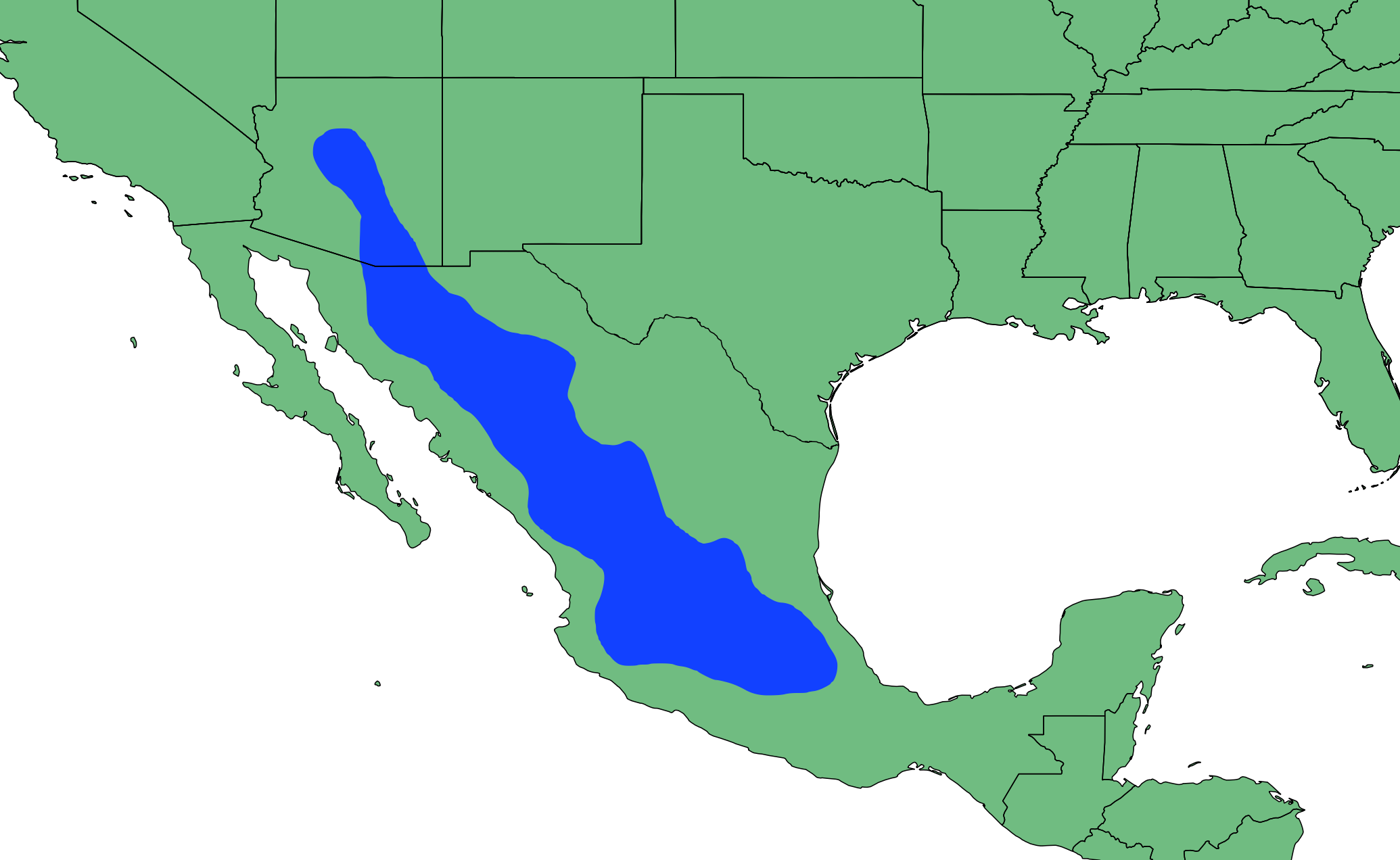

= Mexican garter snake =

Species of snake

The Mexican garter snake (Thamnophis eques) is a species of snake in the family Colubridae. It is found in Mexico and in the United States (Arizona and New Mexico). This harmless snake is semi-aquatic and most of the 10 recognized subspecies are restricted to lake basins in Mexico.

This snake ranges in habitat from deserts and sky island forests of Arizona and New Mexico to the thornscrub and rainforests of Mexico. One subspecies, the Lake Chapala garter snake (T. e. obscurus), is endemic to Lake Chapala.

This snake is a generalist carnivore, feeding on a wide variety of prey, such as lizards, frogs, toads, tadpoles, fish, and even from time to time earthworms, snails, insects, and small mammals.

In north-central Arizona, Northern Mexican garter snake potential aquatic prey captured during minnow trap surveys include nonnative species such as western mosquitofish, red shiners, green sunfish, bluegills, smallmouth bass, largemouth bass, yellow bullheads, black bullheads, common carp, and American bullfrogs (tadpoles, juveniles and subadults). As well as native species such as Woodhouse’s toads (tadpoles, juveniles and adults) and Sonora mud turtles (hatchlings).

== Subspecies ==
Ten subspecies are known. They are listed below, along with their geographic ranges and description.

Image	Common Name	Scientific Name	Geographic Range
	Mexican garter snake	T. e. eques	
	Laguna Totolcingo garter snake	T. e. carmenensis	
	Lake Cuitzeo garter snake	T. e. cuitzeoensis	This subspecies only occurs in Lago de Cuitzeo, Michoacán, Mexico.
	Diluvial garter snake	T. e. diluvialis	The main range of this subspecies is Lake Cajititlan and Lake Atotonilco, as well as between these two lakes and surrounding areas.
	Lake Zacapu garter snake	T. e. insperatus	This subspecies occurs in Lake Zacapu and surrounding canals.
	Northern Mexican garter snake	T. e. megalops	This subspecies occurs in isolated populations of central and southeast Arizona and southwestern New Mexico, and likely parts of Northern Mexico as well.
	Lake Chapala garter snake	T. e. obscurus	This subspecies only occurs in Lake Chapala.
	Lake Pátzcuaro Garter Snake	T. e. patzcuaroensis	This subspecies occurs in at least Lake Patzcuaro and Lake Zirahuén.
	Scott's Mexican Garter Snake	T. e. scotti	This subspecies is found in the lake of Magdalena, in and around.
	Durango Highlands Garter Snake	T. e. virgatenuis	This subspecies occurs in the Midwest mountainous region of Mexico, within and near Durango.
