= Fox's mountain meadow snake =

Conservation status
- Data Deficient (IUCN 3.1)

Scientific classification
- Kingdom: Animalia
- Phylum: Chordata
- Class: Reptilia
- Order: Squamata
- Suborder: Serpentes
- Family: Colubridae
- Genus: Thamnophis
- Species: T. foxi

Binomial name
- Thamnophis foxi (Rossman & Blaney, 1968)
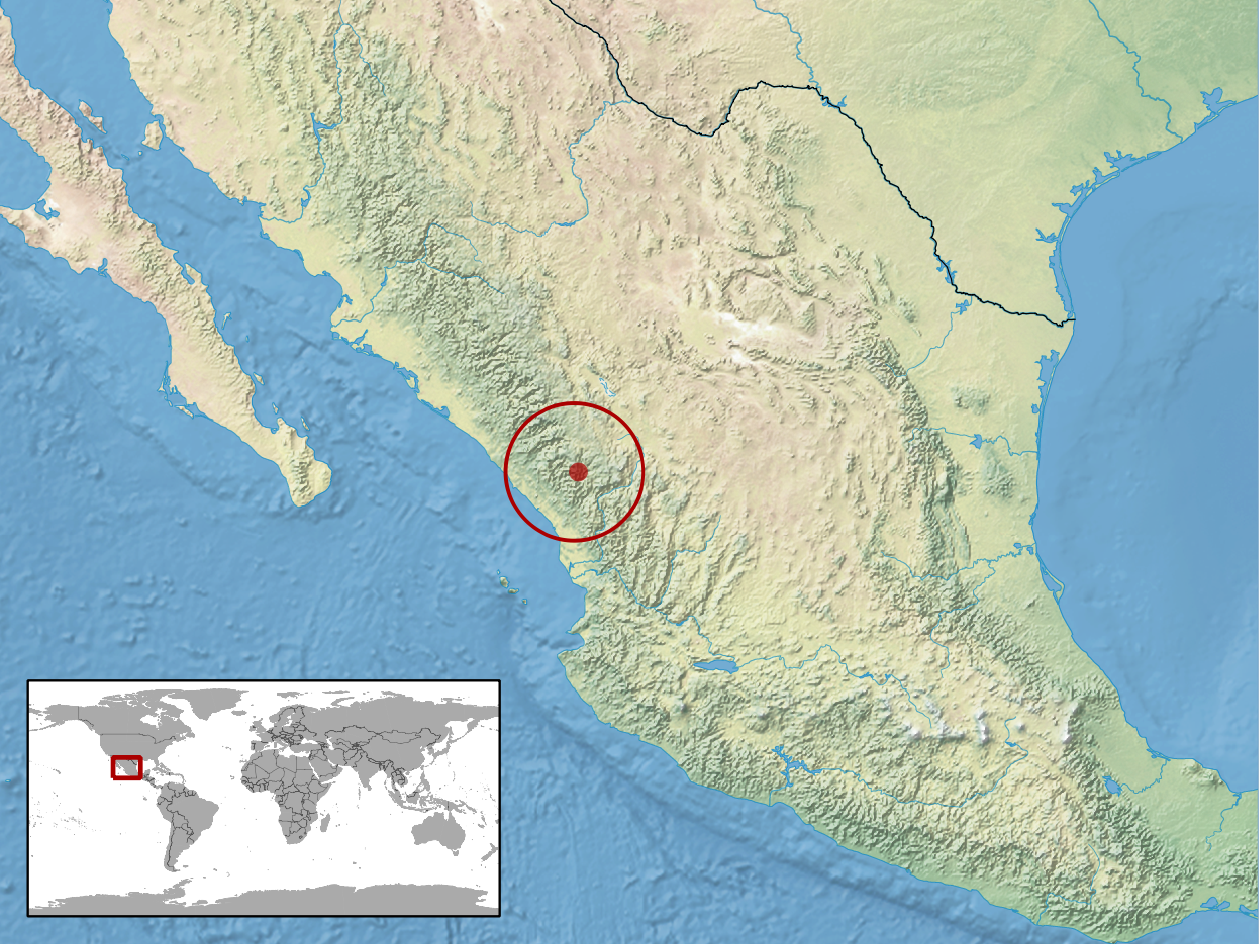

Synonyms
- Adelophis foxi Rossman & Blaney, 1968; Thamnophis foxi — Hallas, Parchman & Feldman, 2021

Species of snake

Fox's mountain meadow snake (Thamnophis foxi), also known commonly as culebra-de vega de Fox and pradera de Fox in Mexican Spanish, is a species of ovoviviparous snake in the family Colubridae. The species, which was described by Douglas A. Rossman and Richard M. Blaney in 1968, is native to northwestern Mexico.

== Etymology ==
The specific name, foxi, is in honor of American herpetologist Wade Fox Jr. (1920–1964).

== Geographic range ==
T. foxi is found in the Mexican state of Durango.

== Habitat ==
The preferred natural habitat of T. foxi is forest, at an altitude of 2,600 m (8,500 ft).

== Description ==
The holotype of T. foxi has a total length (including tail) of 42 cm (17 in). It has five upper labials. The dorsal scales are in 17 rows throughout the length of the body. The anal scale is entire (undivided).

== Pictures ==
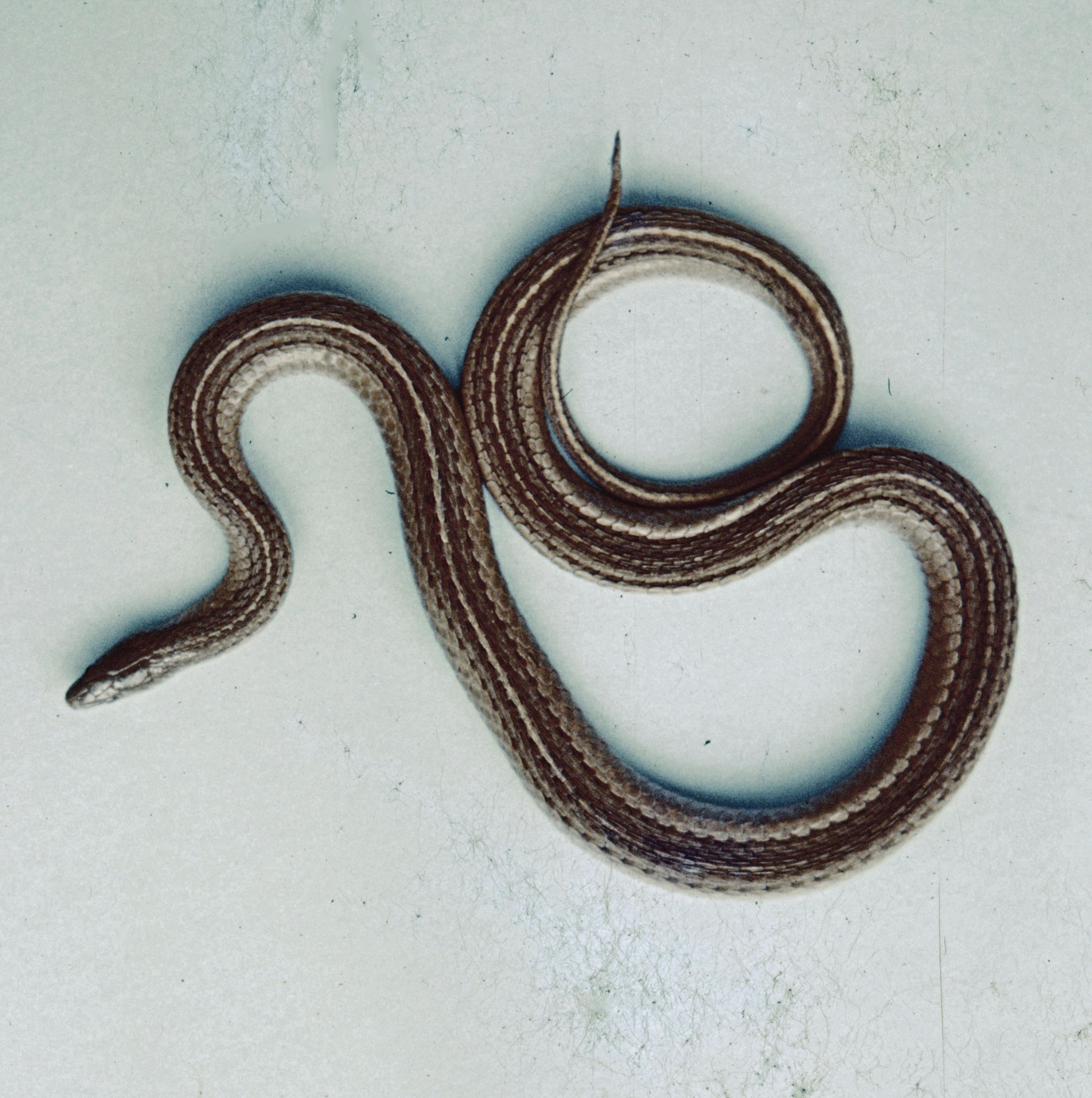

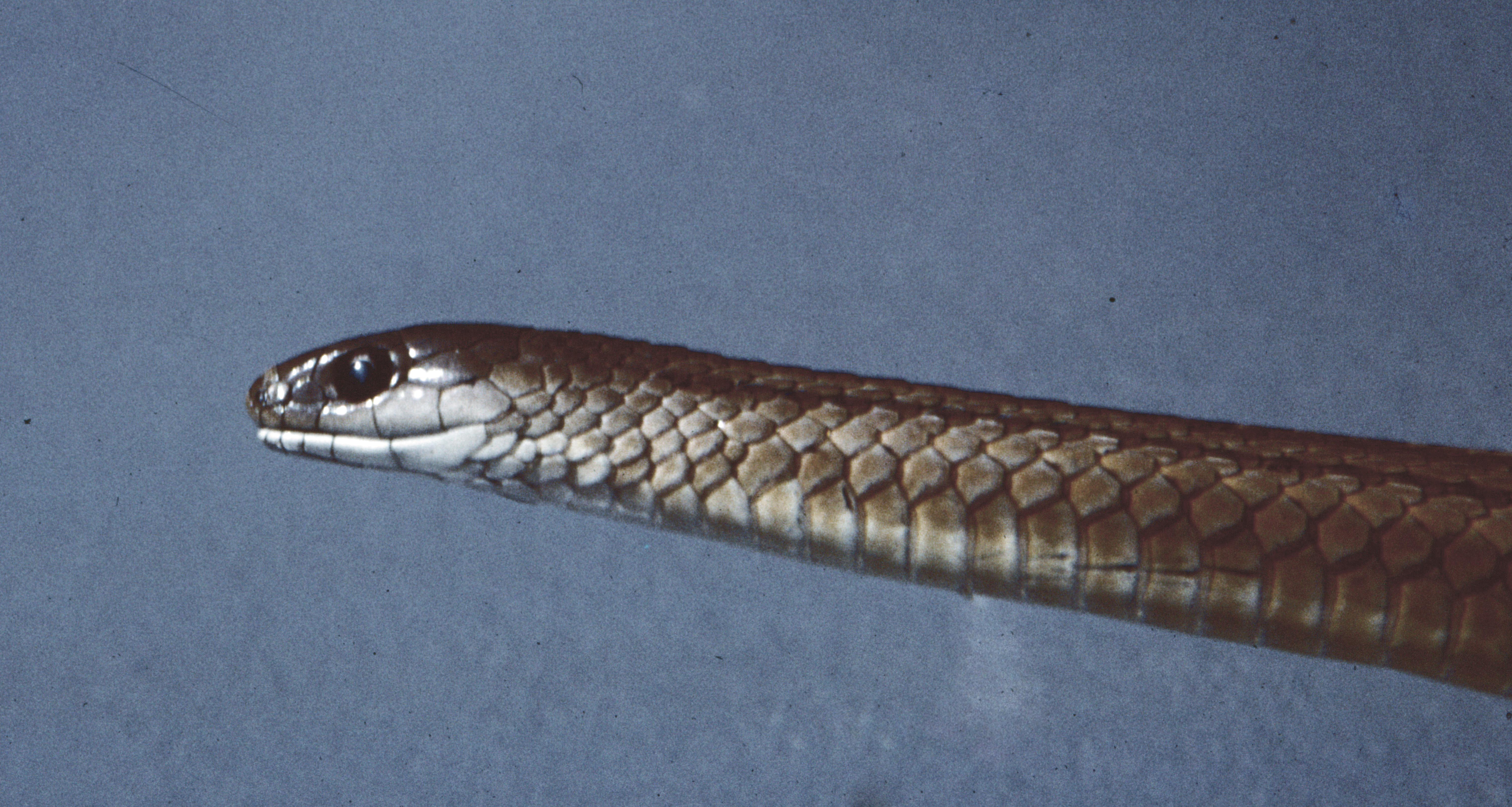

== Reproduction ==
The mode of reproduction of T. foxi is uncertain. The IUCN describes the species as ovoviviparous, whereas the Reptile Database describes it as oviparous, however due to the rest of Thamnophis being ovoviviparous, ovoviviparity is more likely than oviparity.

== Conservation status ==
Specimens LSU40793 and LSU40846 were the last recorded specimens of T. foxi, consisting of a male and female collected on 18 and 19 July 1981 in southwestern Durango, Mexico, most likely around 1.5 miles (2.4 km) west of El Salto. While no detailed location information is included in the specimen record, it is noted that the same collector visited this location almost yearly in the late 1960s.

Threats to the survival of this snake species include ongoing deforestation caused by logging. The area contains pine and pine-oak forests of Pinus durangensis that have been heavily logged and are now severely disturbed. Parts of the area are being reforested for forestry purposes, but it is not known whether reforested P. durangensis stands are suitable for this snake species.
