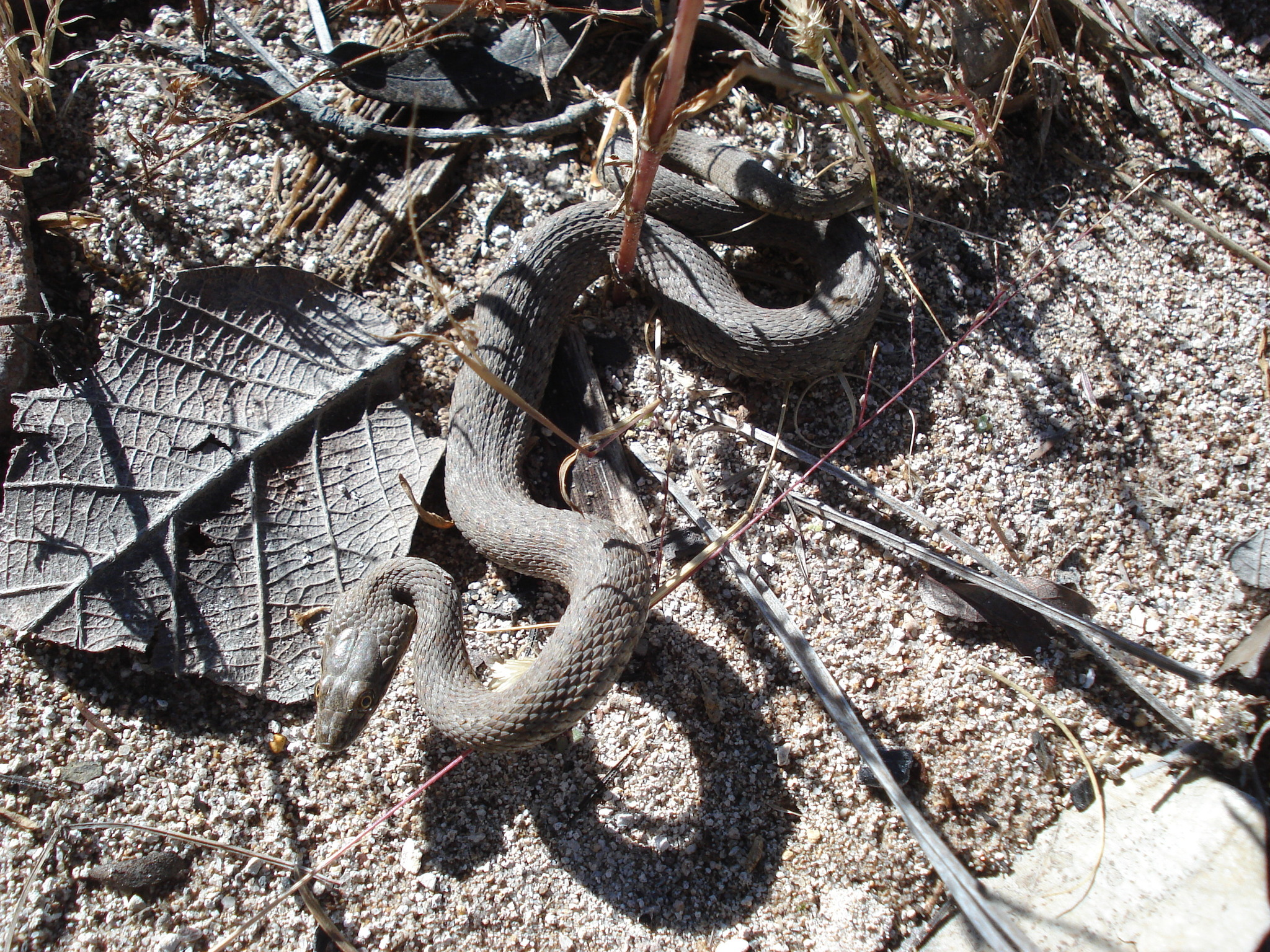

Scientific classification
- Kingdom: Animalia
- Phylum: Chordata
- Class: Reptilia
- Order: Squamata
- Suborder: Serpentes
- Family: Colubridae
- Genus: Thamnophis
- Species: T. unilabialis

Binomial name
- Thamnophis unilabialis (Tanner, 1985)

= Madrean narrow-headed garter snake =

Species of snake

The Madrean narrow-headed garter snake (Thamnophis unilabialis) is a species of snake in the family Colubridae. The species is endemic to Mexico.
