= Pilarcitos Creek =

Pilarcitos Creek Pillarcitos Creek, Arroyo de San Simon y San Judas, Arroyo de los Pilarcitos
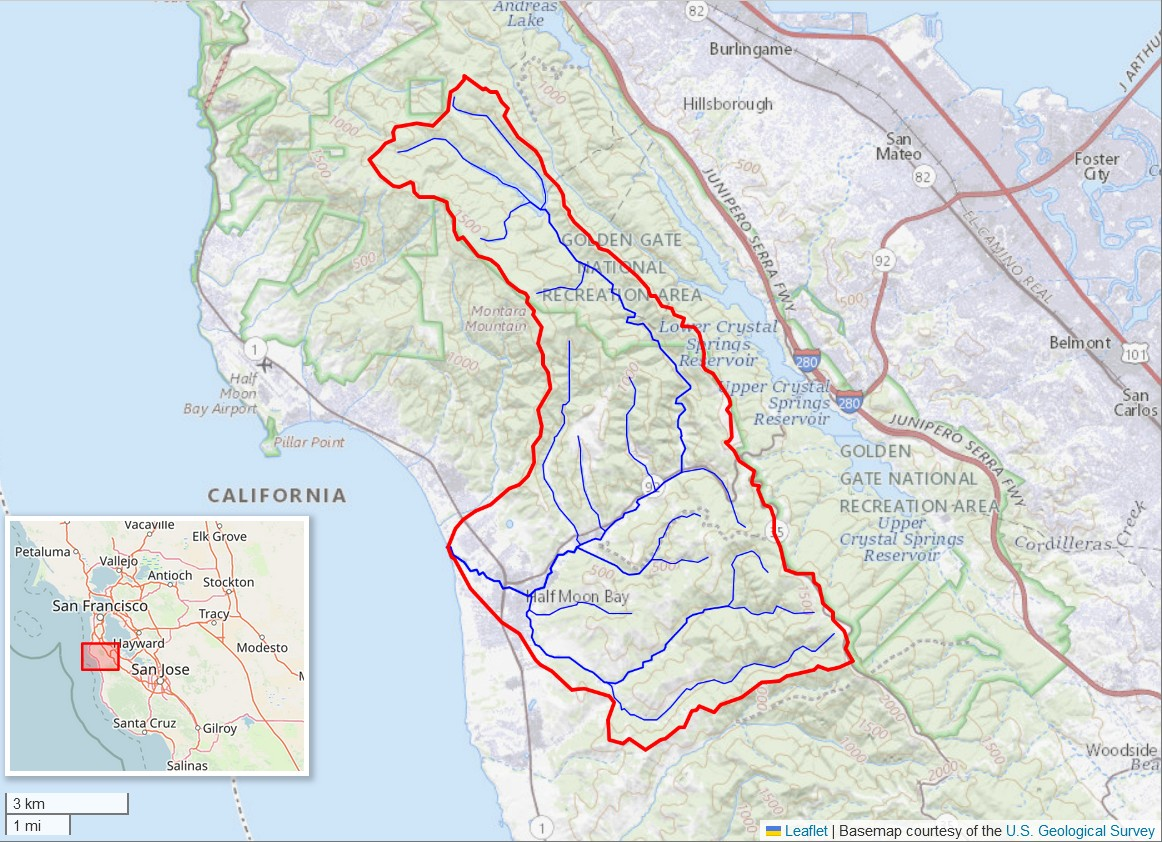
- Pilarcitos Creek Watershed (Interactive map)

Location
- Country: United States
- State: California
- Region: San Mateo County
- City: Half Moon Bay

Physical characteristics
- Source: East slope of North Peak, Montara Mountain
  - coordinates: 37°19′12″N 122°09′19″W
  - elevation: 1,430 ft (440 m)
- Mouth: Half Moon Bay in the Pacific Ocean
  - location: Half Moon Bay, California
  - coordinates: 37°28′31″N 122°26′59″W
  - elevation: 0 ft (0 m)

Basin features
- Tributaries
  - left: Mills creek, Albert Gulch, Madonna Creek, Arroyo León
  - right: Nuff Creek, Corinda Los Trancos Creek, Apanolio Creek

Pilarcitos Creek (Spanish for: Little Pillars or Pillaries Creek) is a 13.5-mile-long (21.7 km) coastal stream in San Mateo County, California, United States, that rises on the western slopes of the Santa Cruz Mountains and descends through Pilarcitos Canyon to discharge into the Pacific Ocean Half Moon Bay State Beach.

The Pilarcitos Creek watershed is a significant area of ecological, cultural and economic diversity. It is a source of clean drinking water for residents of the central coast and San Francisco Bay Area and supports several natural-resource based economies – including agriculture and recreational tourism. The watershed is also experiencing increased competition for water between agricultural, domestic, recreational, commercial and environmental uses.

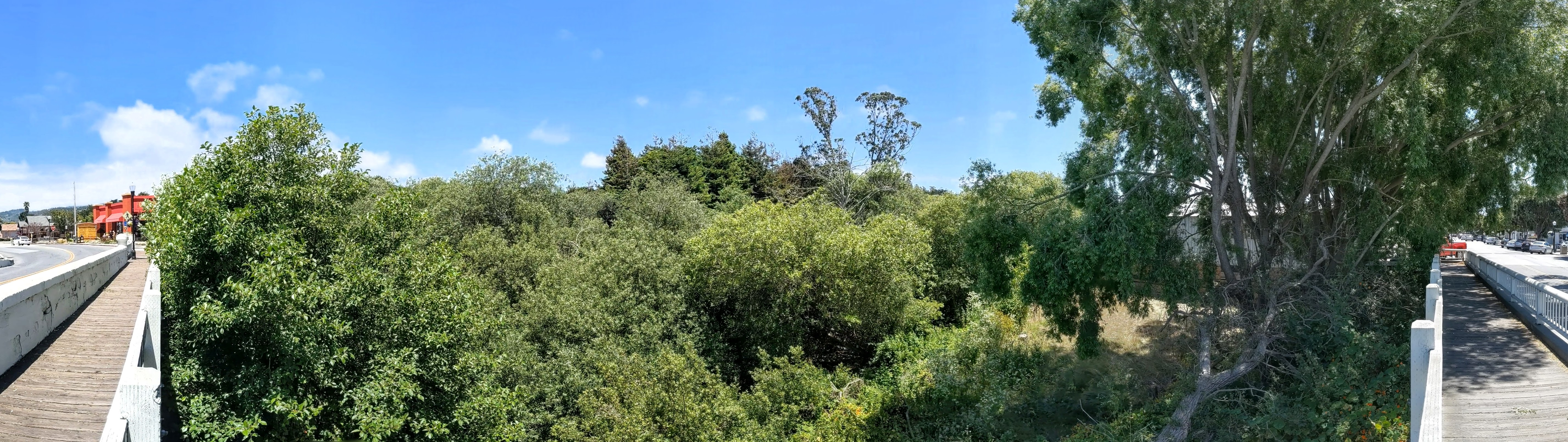
The John L. Carter Park with tree-choked Pilarcitos Creek – panoramic view from the Main Street Bridge in Half Moon Bay, the first concrete bridge in San Mateo County, California, 1900

== History ==
The Portolà expedition camped on the creek on October 28, 1769, and Father Juan Crespí named it Arroyo de San Simon y San Judas in honor of the Catholic Feast day for the Apostles Simon and Jude. The name Arroyo de los Pilarcitos meaning "creek of the little pillar-like rocks" was recorded in land grant papers as early as 1836.

In recent history, public and private stakeholders in the watershed have been working together intermittently since 1992, when two separate pollution discharge events occurred. Settlements from pollution discharge events initiated a trust fund for restoration activities. Associated money was used to develop the 1996 Pilarcitos Creek Restoration Plan. The Pilarcitos Creek Advisory Committee (PCAC) was created as a citizens advisory committee to provide input on the development of the Plan, and to provide advice and guidance to the Project Manager, the San Mateo County Resource Conservation District (RCD).

In 2005, a group of over 20 local and regional agencies and advocacy groups gathered with nearly 200 members of the community at a water summit to discuss watershed-based approaches for balancing the beneficial uses of water in Pilarcitos Creek.

In January 2007 watershed stakeholders established the Pilarcitos Creek Restoration Workgroup to guide the development of an Integrated Watershed Management Plan (IWMP) to promote balanced solutions to effectively manage the Pilarcitos Creek watershed that satisfy environmental, public health, domestic water supply, and economic interests.

== Watershed description ==
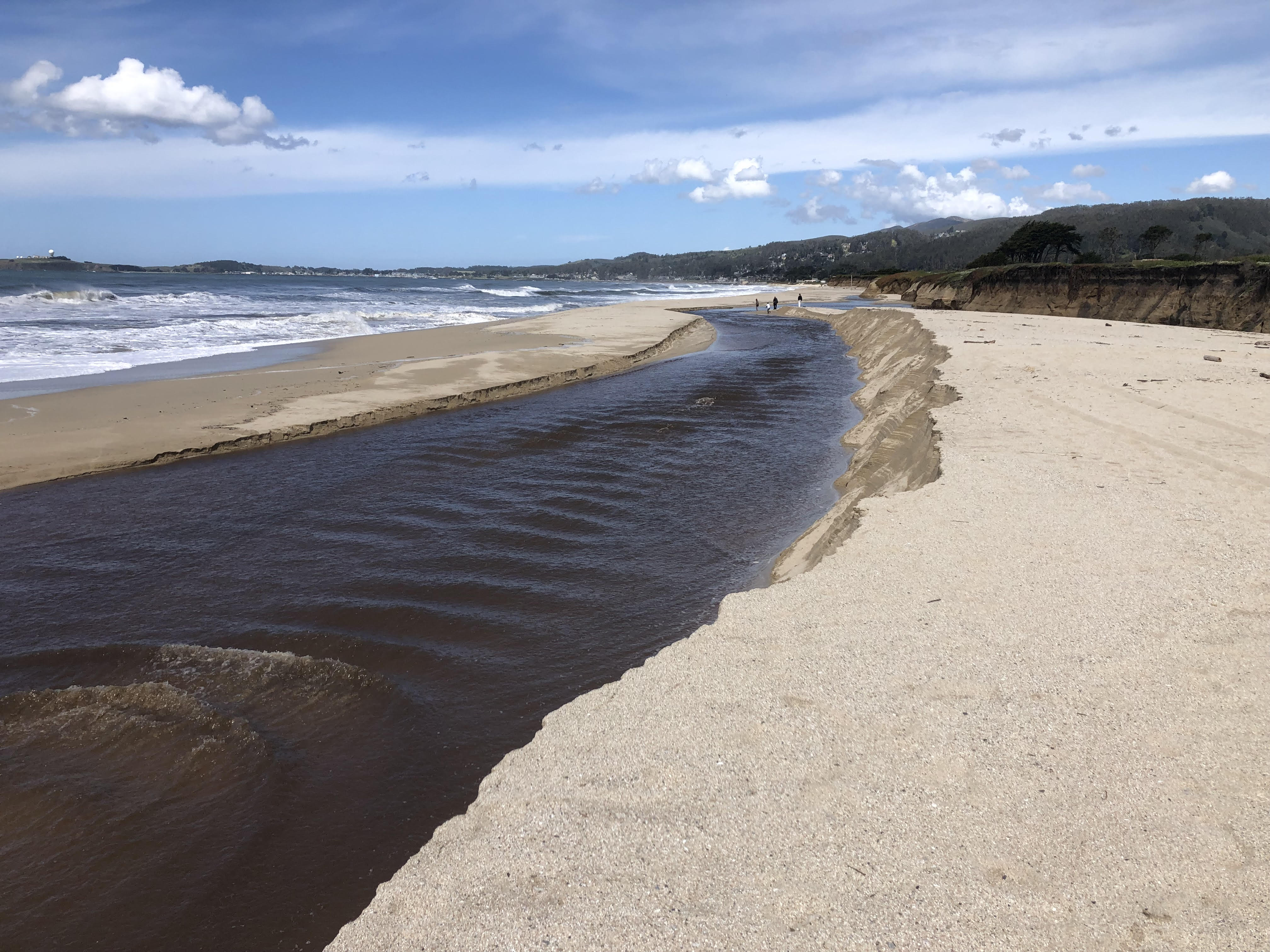
Pilarcitos and Frenchmans Creeks discharge as one at Venice Beach.

The Pilarcitos Creek watershed drains 30 square miles (78 km^{2}). The creek begins at 1,430 feet (440 m) on the south slope of Whiting Ridge 0.8 miles (1.3 km) east of the North Peak of Montara Mountain, flows east-southeast, to Pilarcitos Reservoir where it is joined by Spring Valley Creek. Pilarcitos Dam was built in 1864 and two miles downstream Stone Dam was built in 1871. Further downstream, Pilarcitos Creek is joined by Albert Gulch in Albert Canyon at Highway 92. Albert Gulch is named for the ranch of the William C. Albrecht family, who lived here from the 1870s until 1954. Here Pilarcitos Creek turns to flow southwest for 3 miles (4.8 km) to the community of Half Moon Bay. Along the way, it is joined on the right (heading downstream) by Nuff Creek, Corinda Los Trancos Creek, and Apanolio Creek, then from the left by Madonna Creek and Arroyo León before heading and west-northwest for 3.2 miles (5.1 km) to enter Half Moon Bay and the Pacific Ocean at Elmar Beach. The creek occasionally joins Frenchmans Creek at Venice Beach, discharging into the ocean as one. This occurs most commonly during the winter and spring months after sufficient rainfall and significant wave action. The maximum rate of discharge was recorded at 4,750 cubic feet per second (135 m^{3}/s) on January 4, 1982. The peak stage height was recorded at 14.64 feet on December 31, 2022.

As early as 1860 a major diversion of Pilarcitos Creek was constructed to supply water to the burgeoning population of San Francisco. Two different tunnels carry water east from Pilarcitos Lake Reservoir and Stone Dam Reservoir, respectively. At the present time Pilarcitos Creek not only continues to supply water to San Francisco and the Peninsula via the Crystal Springs Reservoir, but it is also the principal source of potable water for the city of Half Moon Bay and coastside vicinity.

Jurisdiction over land use decisions in the lower creek regions is under the city of Half Moon Bay. Land use decisions in the upper reaches are with the San Mateo County. Both entities administer provisions of California's Local Coastal Program.

== Watershed condition ==
The Pilarcitos Creek watershed is host to a number of plant and animal species, including anadromous steelhead trout (Oncorhynchus mykiss) which are listed as "threatened" by the Federal government. Over recent history, physical and biological impacts resulting from human activity have degraded the overall watershed condition, threatening native plant and animal species including steelhead. In addition, water demand has increased with the growth of residential, agricultural, and industrial development in the Pilarcitos Creek watershed, decreasing the amount of water available for surface flow in streams.

Several key watershed management issues were identified in 2008 following a review of information about the existing state of the watershed. The key watershed management issues include: -Instream flows to support aquatic resources during critical summer and fall periods. -Other ecosystem factors, including fish passage, instream habitat, watershed erosion, channel maintenance, riparian vegetation, exotic invasive species, and the spring estuary/summer lagoon. -Social issues, including community engagement, landowner concerns, beach quality, and landfill issues.

Fecal coliform levels at the mouth periodically violate State of California water quality standards.

The Pilarcitos Creek watershed holds a considerable biodiversity and is confirmed habitat for the endangered San Francisco garter snake. arroyo willow (Salix lasiolepis) and red alder (Alnus rubra) are the dominant riparian trees in the lower watershed, with coast Douglas fir (Pseudotsuga menziesii var. menziesii) forest.

== Integrated management plan ==
The IWMP provides a set of recommendations for projects that help to achieve the goals set forward in the plan. The purpose of the IWMP is to promote balanced solutions to effectively manage the Pilarcitos Creek watershed that satisfy environmental, public health, domestic water supply, and economic interests. It prioritizes restoration projects that individually or collectively help to achieve six key goals: 1. Protect and recover Steelhead trout and other native aquatic and riparian species 2. Enhance streamflows while maintaining yield 3. Manage stream channel corridors to reduce erosion, sedimentation and flood risks 4. Increase native riparian vegetation 5. Maintain good water quality conditions 6. Promote community and stakeholder collaboration

For each goal, a series of objectives offers more specific guidance about how each goal will be achieved. The goals and objectives reflect agreement by the workgroup achieved through an ongoing dialogue and public input. Together, the goals and objectives provide a foundation for the implementation strategy and plan.

== Pilarcitos Restoration Workgroup ==
Implementation of the IWMP continues to be driven by the Pilarcitos Restoration Workgroup and the collaboration among IWMP stakeholders. The purpose of the Workgroup is to work as partners to promote balanced management solutions in the watershed.

Current Workgroup members are California Department of Fish and Wildlife, California State Parks, City of Half Moon Bay, Coastside County Water District, Coastside Land Trust, Committee for Green Foothills, Midpeninsula Regional Open Space District, National Marine Fisheries Service, Peninsula Open Space Trust, Pilarcitos Creek Advisory Committee, San Francisco Public Utilities Commission, San Mateo County, San Mateo County Farm Bureau, San Mateo County Resource Conservation District, Sewer Authority Mid-Coastside, and Surfrider Foundation - San Mateo Chapter. The RCD convenes the Workgroup.

== See also ==
- List of watercourses in the San Francisco Bay Area
- Arroyo de en Medio
- Naples Creek
- Frenchmans Creek
