= Half Moon Bay (California) =

Body of water on the coast of northern California

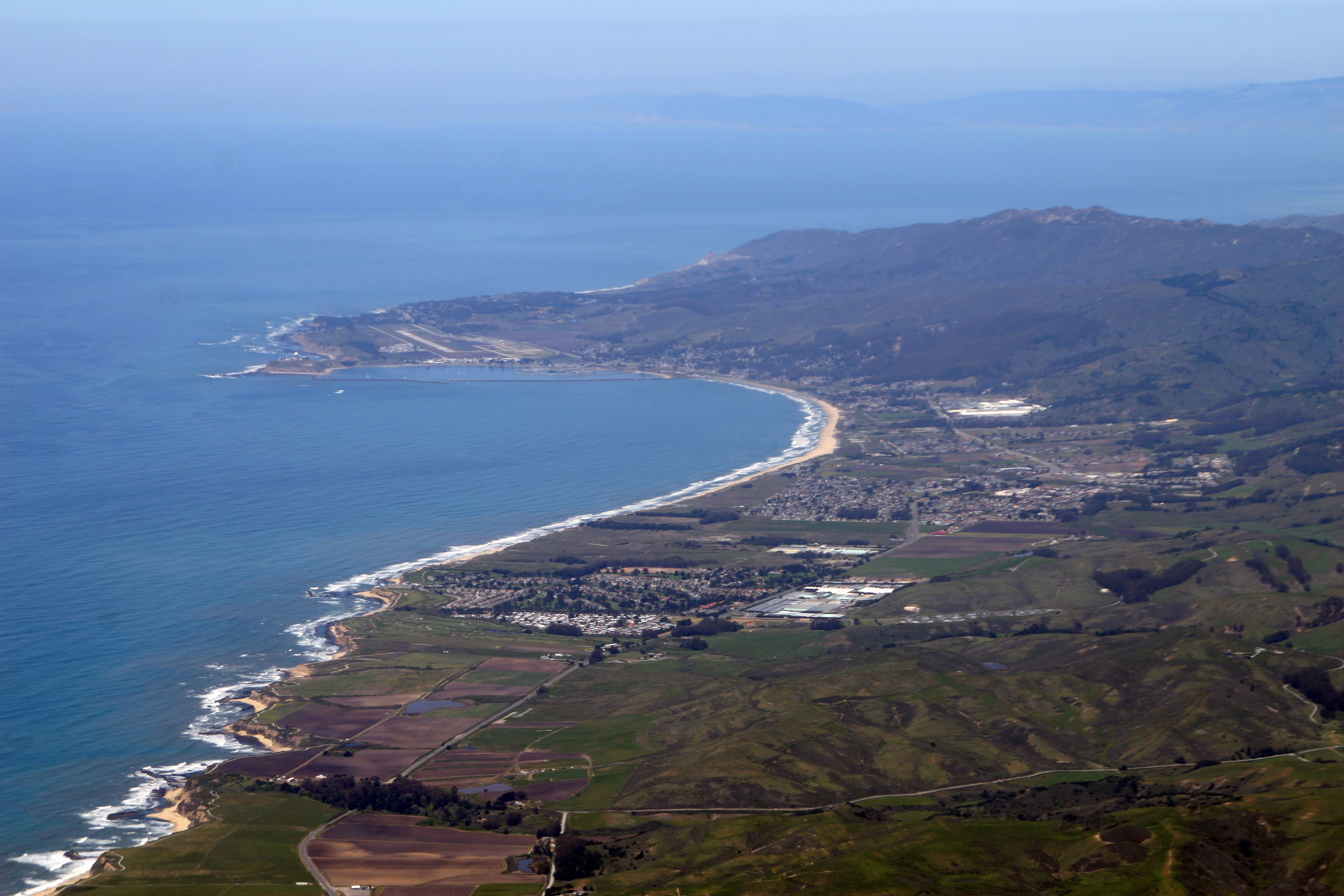
- Half Moon Bay and Pillar Point (top), 2009

- Location within California Location within the United States
- Location: Northern California
- Coordinates: 37°29′00″N 122°28′19″W
- Basin countries: United States
- Settlements: Half Moon Bay, Miramar Beach

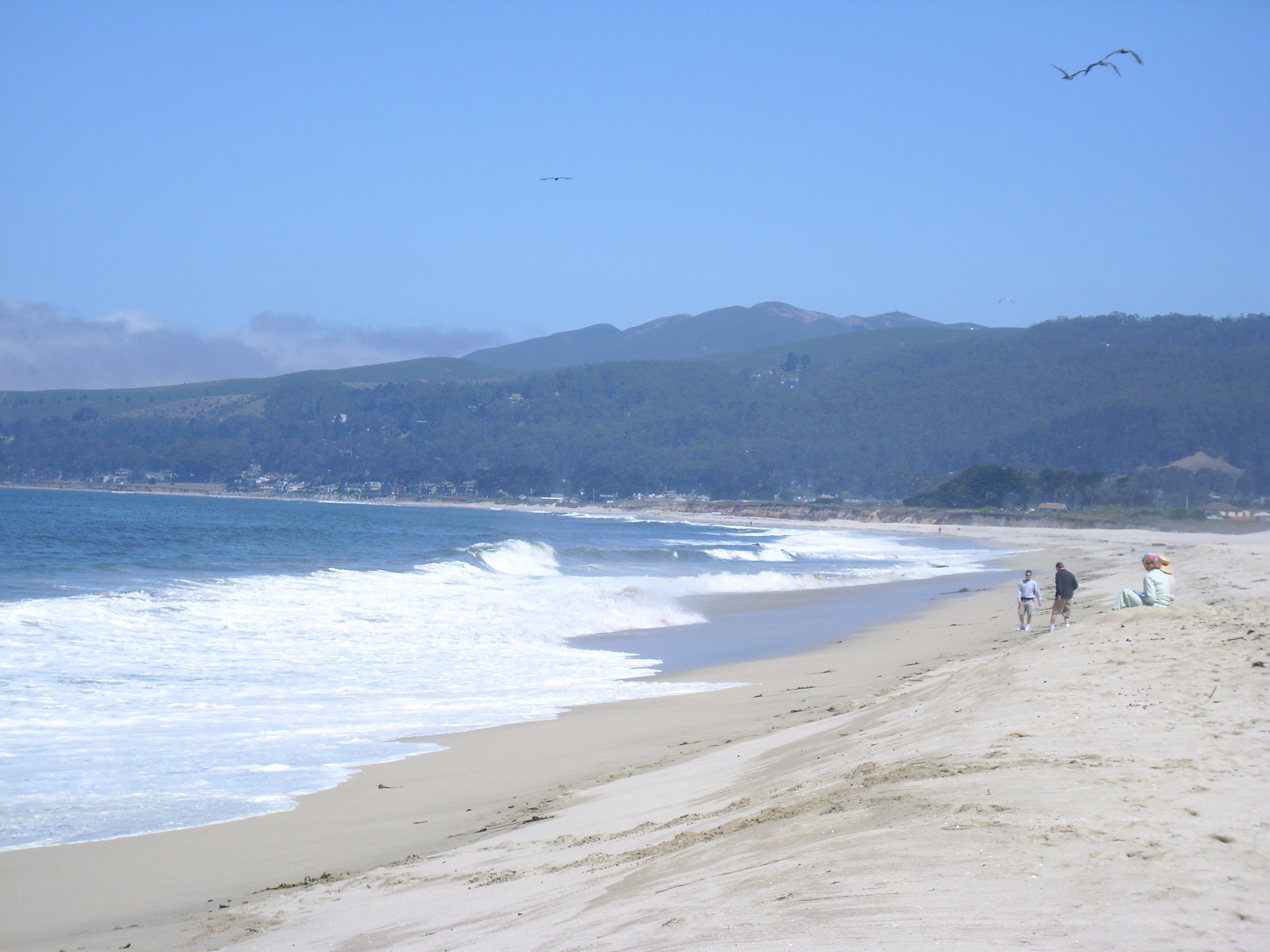
A view of Half Moon Bay and surroundings

Half Moon Bay is a bay of the Pacific Ocean on the coast of San Mateo County, California. The bay is approximately semi-circular, hence the name half moon, with sea access to the south. Coastal towns located there are Princeton-by-the-Sea, Miramar, El Granada, and the city of Half Moon Bay.

The surfing location Mavericks is located on the outer edge of the peninsula which forms the bay. Miramar Beach is located along the shore of the bay opposite the peninsula.

Marine species include flatfish, the commercially important English sole, rockfish, surfperch, Pacific herring, lingcod; and abundant winter species including starry flounder and top-smelt.

The bay provides an example of a logarithmic spiral beach.

== See also ==
- Pilarcitos Creek
- Half Moon Bay State Beach
