= Denniston Creek =

River in California, United States

Coordinates: 37.50383°N 122.486922°W

Denniston Creek is a 4.4-mile-long (7.1 km) coastal stream in western San Mateo County, California. Denniston Creek rises on the western slopes of Montara Mountain and discharges to the Pacific Ocean at Pillar Point Harbor somewhat north of El Granada Beach. The watershed of Denniston Creek is made up of relatively permeable sandy soils capable of significant recharge to its aquifers, which supply a moderate amount of potable water to the local area.

== Groundwater ==
In the headwaters reach, high on Montara Mountain, coarse grained decomposed granite overlies heavily fractured granitic based bedrock aquifers. This upper pocket groundwater complex feeds down-basin alluvial fan deposits on the coastal plain. These alluvial fans exhibit some characteristics of a confined aquifer, but also respond to pressure and recharge from precipitation.

== Mouth ==
At the mouth of Denniston Creek, the stream cuts through a gently sloping marine terrace plain of alluvium. In a 1980s biological survey, sightings of the endangered San Francisco garter snake were made. Denniston Creek is within the domain of the San Mateo County Local Coastal Plan

== See also ==
- Arroyo de en Medio
- List of watercourses in the San Francisco Bay Area
- Rare species
- Riparian zone
