= Naples Creek =

Stream in San Mateo County, California

Coordinates: 37°29′21″N 122°27′22″W

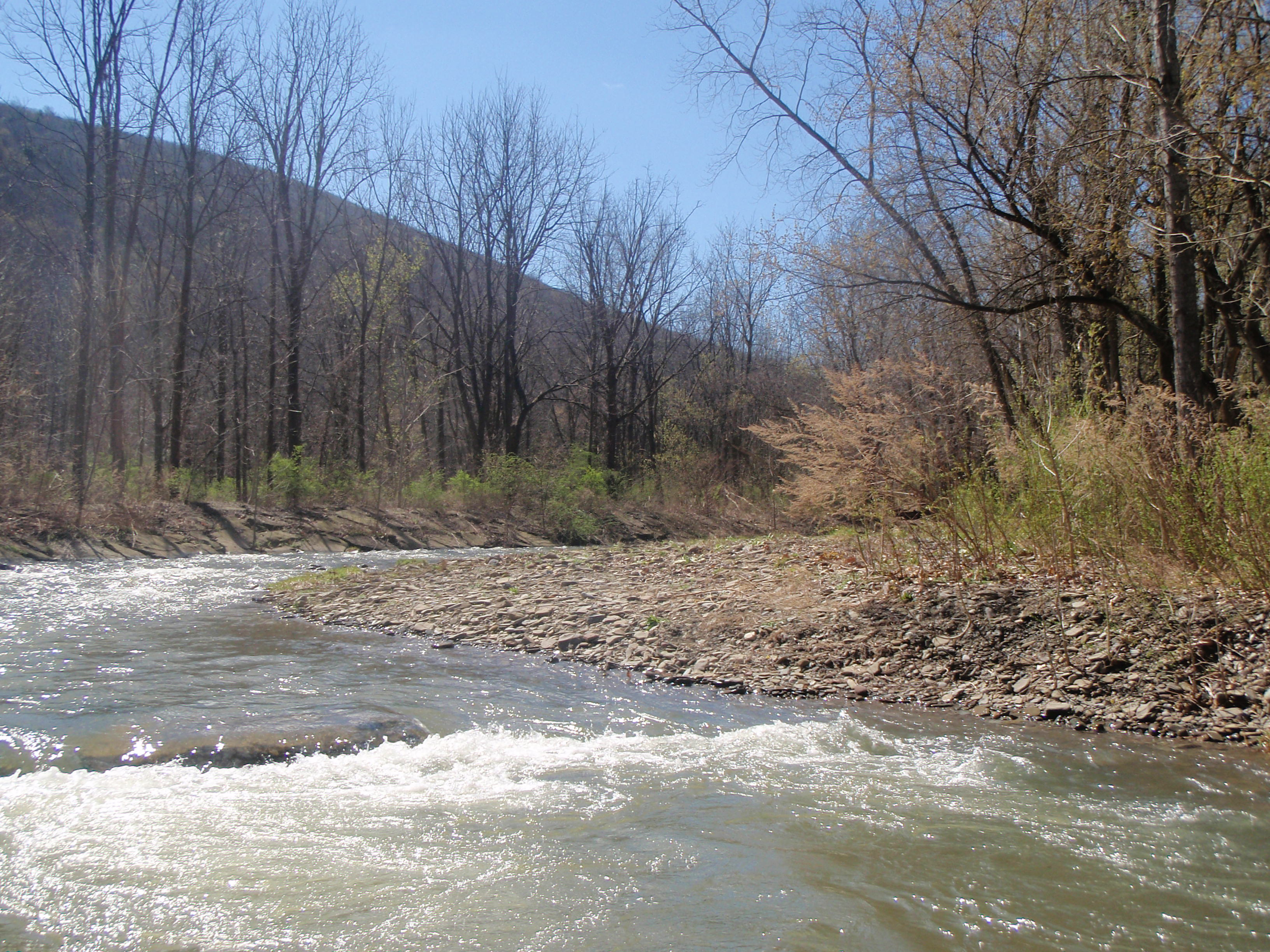
Photo Of Naples Creek

Naples Creek is a stream in San Mateo County, California, United States that rises on the western slopes of the Santa Cruz Mountains and discharges to the Pacific Ocean. The specific point of discharge is onto Naples Beach, a unit of the Half Moon Bay State Beach. This watercourse runs through the city of Half Moon Bay, which municipality has planning jurisdiction over the creekside area within its city boundaries. In the Open Space Element of Half Moon Bay's General Plan, Naples Creek is designated to have significant wetland and riparian zone biotic resources.

The city of Half Moon Bay is proposing a trail along Naples Creek to expand on the recreational use of this natural resource. The area near the Mouth of Naples Creek is already in public ownership and is traversed by the coastside public trail along the low-lying blufftop. Further upstream along the banks of Naples Creek, the lower reach banks are in public ownership as within the right-of-way of Guerrero Avenue resources. The city recognizes the entire riparian area as an important open space resource and is considering re-zoning to open space the entire passage of the stream through the Half Moon Bay.

== Hydrology ==
Naples Creek rises in the foothills of the Santa Cruz Mountains at an approximate headwaters elevation of over 400 feet and runs southwest through agricultural land and urban developed areas in the lower reach to the Pacific Ocean. Regionally, both the surface water and the groundwater flow with the slope of the terrain, that is, from the northeast to the southwest. Groundwater in the lower reach has been found at 20 to 80 feet below the surface in unconsolidated Quaternary marine terrace deposits and in unconsolidated Quaternary alluvium. There are few groundwater barriers in the vicinity of the mouth of Naples Creek, a circumstance giving rise to local salt water intrusion. Chlorides exceeding 100 parts per million in groundwater were found in the early 1970s along this part of Half Moon Bay State Beach. Near the mouth of Naples Creek the banktop elevation varies between an elevation ranging from 30 to 40 feet above mean sea datum.

== See also ==
- Arroyo de en Medio
- List of watercourses in the San Francisco Bay Area
- Miramar Beach
