= Miramar Beach =

Miramar Beach may refer to:

- Miramar Beach, California, in San Mateo County
- Miramar Beach, Florida
- Miramar Beach, Goa, India
- Rosewood Miramar Beach, a hotel in Montecito, Santa Barbara County, California, operated by Rosewood Hotels & Resorts
