= Arroyo de en Medio =

River in California, United States

Coordinates: 37.492996°N 122.459977°W

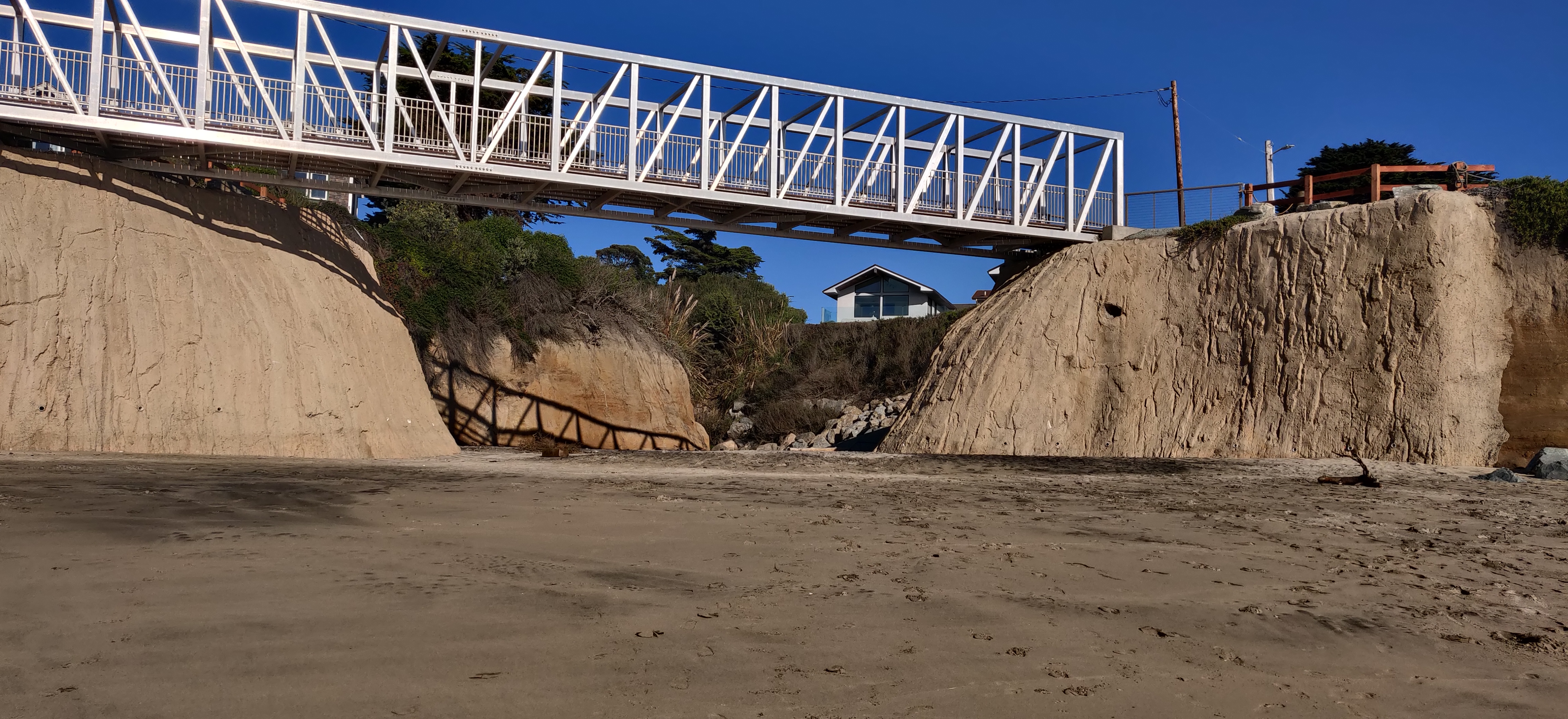
Mouth of Arroyo de en Medio, where it enters the Pacific Ocean

Arroyo de en Medio (Spanish for "in the middle creek") is a 2.5-mile-long (4.0 km) coastal stream in western San Mateo County, California. Arroyo de en Medio rises on the western slopes of Montara Mountain and discharges to the Pacific Ocean at Half Moon Bay at the location of the unincorporated community of Miramar at Miramar Beach. The watershed of Arroyo de en Medio consists of relatively permeable sandy soils capable of significant recharge to its aquifers, which supply considerable potable water to the local area. Arroyo is Spanish for creek; de en Medio means literally "of in between" but a closer more functional translation may be in the middle.

== Groundwater ==
In the headwaters area, coarse grained decomposed granite overlies heavily fractured granitic based bedrock aquifers. This upper pocket groundwater complex feeds down-basin alluvial fan deposits on the coastal plain. These alluvial fans exhibit some characteristics of a confined aquifer, but also respond to recharge from precipitation.

== Mouth ==
At the mouth of Arroyo de en Medio, the stream cuts through a flat marine terrace plain of alluvium, forming steep sided banks of approximately 40 degrees with respect to the channel floor; the channel floor is about eight meters deep relative to the bank tops. Even at the mouth, Arroyo de en Medio is considered intermittent, since the flow typically ceases in the summer months. However, there is some summer standing water in the channel near the mouth, the result of street runoff from summer irrigation and car washing. The stream mouth is clear of canopy vegetation but densely filled with sedges in a marshy setting.

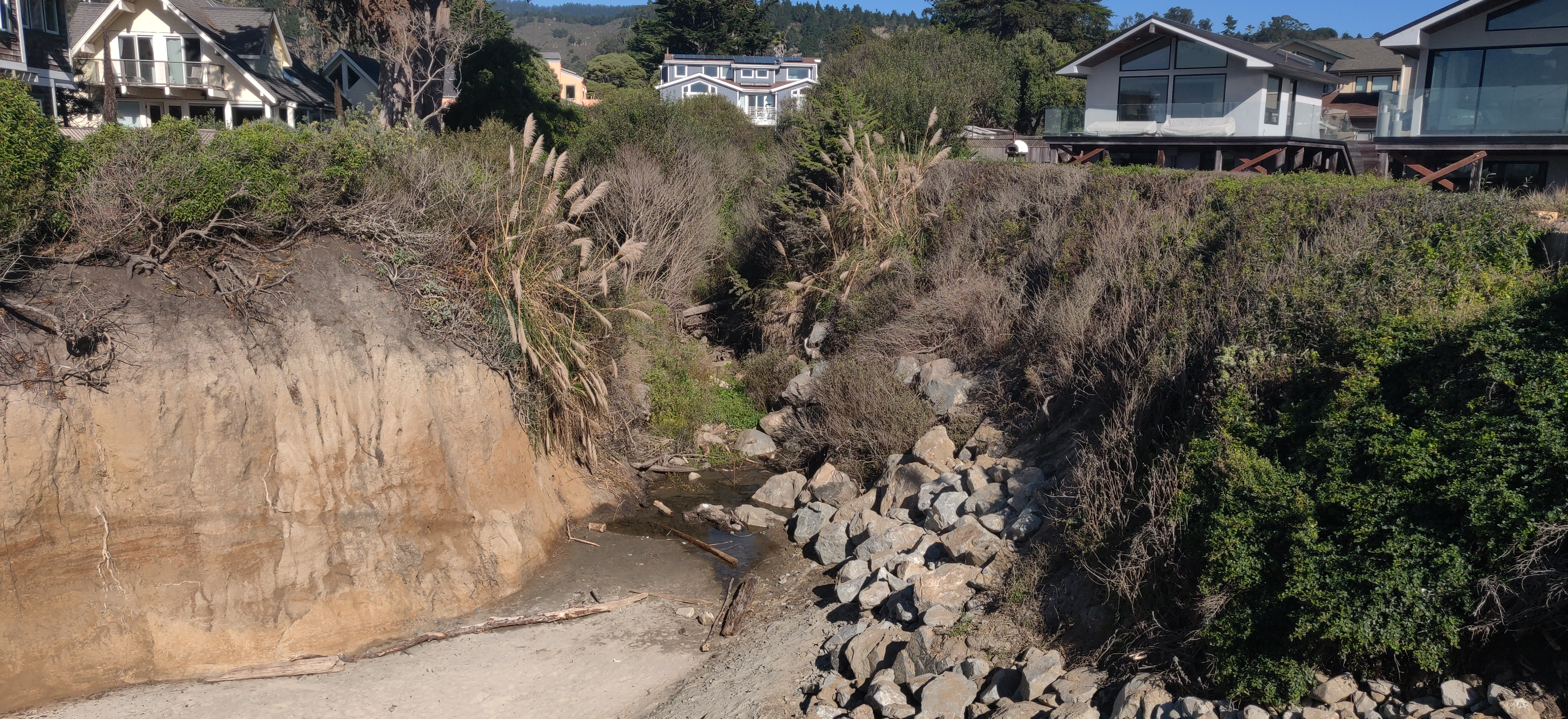
Vegetation at the mouth of Arroyo de en Medio

The streambed at the mouth is essentially covered by water dependent plant species. These include willow (Salix sp.), sedge (Carex sp.), stream monkey flower (Mimulus sp.) and red alder (Alnus oregona). These and other riparian plants form the food resource of many faunal species, either directly or indirectly. Many orb web weaving spiders at the mouth indicates the abundance of insects utilized as prey by certain vertebrates such as salamanders, tree frogs, lizards, and many resident and migratory birds. The site is also utilized for avafaunal nesting and breeding. In the 1989 survey by Earth Metrics, no sightings of the endangered San Francisco garter snake were made, although this snake was observed at nearby Denniston Creek. The mouth reach is classified as a riparian corridor under the strict meaning defined by the San Mateo County Local Coastal Plan

== See also ==
- Denniston Creek
- List of watercourses in the San Francisco Bay Area
- Naples Creek
