= Miramar Beach, California =

Sandy beach in San Mateo County, California, USA

Coordinates: 37.493274°N 122.460254°W

Miramar Beach is a sandy beach in western San Mateo County, California. Miramar Beach is one of the numerous beaches on Half Moon Bay, a Pacific Ocean embayment noted for its surfing and extensive visitation. The marine terrace above the beach itself is situated approximately eight meters above mean sea level, and on this terrace is positioned the small unincorporated community of Miramar, which is a residential setting that also has several coastal visitor serving uses such as restaurant and lodging facilities. A stream named Arroyo de en Medio discharges onto Miramar Beach into the Pacific Ocean.

Access to Miramar beach from State Route 1 requires a turn west on Magellan Avenue, then left on Mirada Road. A public trail lies along the blufftop spanning three miles of coastline from Miramar to the city of Half Moon Bay; this trail affords sweeping marine views and good birdwatching.

== Arroyo de en Medio ==
Arroyo de en Medio is a stream that cuts through a flat marine terrace plain emptying onto Miramar Beach. This creek forms steep sided banks of approximately 40 degrees with respect to the channel floor directly above Miramar Beach; the channel floor is about eight meters deep relative to the bank tops. Even at the mouth, Arroyo de en Medio is considered intermittent, since the flow typically ceases in the summer months. However, there is some summer standing water in the channel near the mouth, the result of street runoff from summer irrigation and car washing. The stream mouth is clear of canopy vegetation but densely filled with sedges in a marshy setting.

The streambed at the mouth of Arroyo de en Medio is covered by water dependent plant species. These include willow (Salix sp.), sedge (Carex sp.), stream monkey flower (Mimulus sp.) and red alder (Alnus oregona). These and other riparian plants form the food resource of many faunal species, either directly or indirectly. Many orb web weaving spiders at the mouth indicates the abundance of insects utilized as prey by certain vertebrates such as salamanders, tree frogs, lizards, and many resident and migratory birds. The site is also utilized for avafaunal nesting and breeding. In the 1989 survey by Earth Metrics, no sightings of the endangered San Francisco garter snake were made, although this snake was observed at nearby Denniston Creek. The mouth reach is classified as a riparian corridor under the strict meaning defined by the San Mateo County Local Coastal Plan.

== See also ==
- Half Moon Bay State Beach
- List of beaches in California
- List of California state parks
