= Arroyo León =

Stream in San Mateo County, California

Coordinates: 37.44993°N 122.41239°W

Arroyo León (Spanish for "Lion Creek") is a 6.5-mile-long (10.5 km) stream in San Mateo County, California which is a tributary of Pilarcitos Creek.

== See also ==
- List of watercourses in the San Francisco Bay Area
