= Nuff Creek =

River in California, United States

Coordinates: 37.487718°N 122.391918°W

Nuff Creek is a 2.0-mile-long (3.2 km) stream in San Mateo County, California which is a tributary of Pilarcitos Creek. It has an elevation of 197 feet and is most frequently used as a kayaking location. The closest major town is Half Moon Bay.

== See also ==
- List of watercourses in the San Francisco Bay Area
