= Apanolio Creek =

River in California, United States

Coordinates: 37.476051°N 122.411919°W

Apanolio Creek is a 3.6-mile-long (5.8 km) southward-flowing stream in San Mateo County, California, United States which is a tributary of Pilarcitos Creek.

== See also ==
- List of watercourses in the San Francisco Bay Area
