= Corinda Los Trancos Creek =

Stream in San Mateo County, California, US

Coordinates: 37.479107°N 122.404974°W

Corinda Los Trancos Creek (Spanish for "surrendering skips creek") is a 1.6-mile-long (2.6 km) stream in San Mateo County, California, which is a tributary of Pilarcitos Creek.

== See also ==
- List of watercourses in the San Francisco Bay Area
