= Poplar Beach =

Beach in California, United States

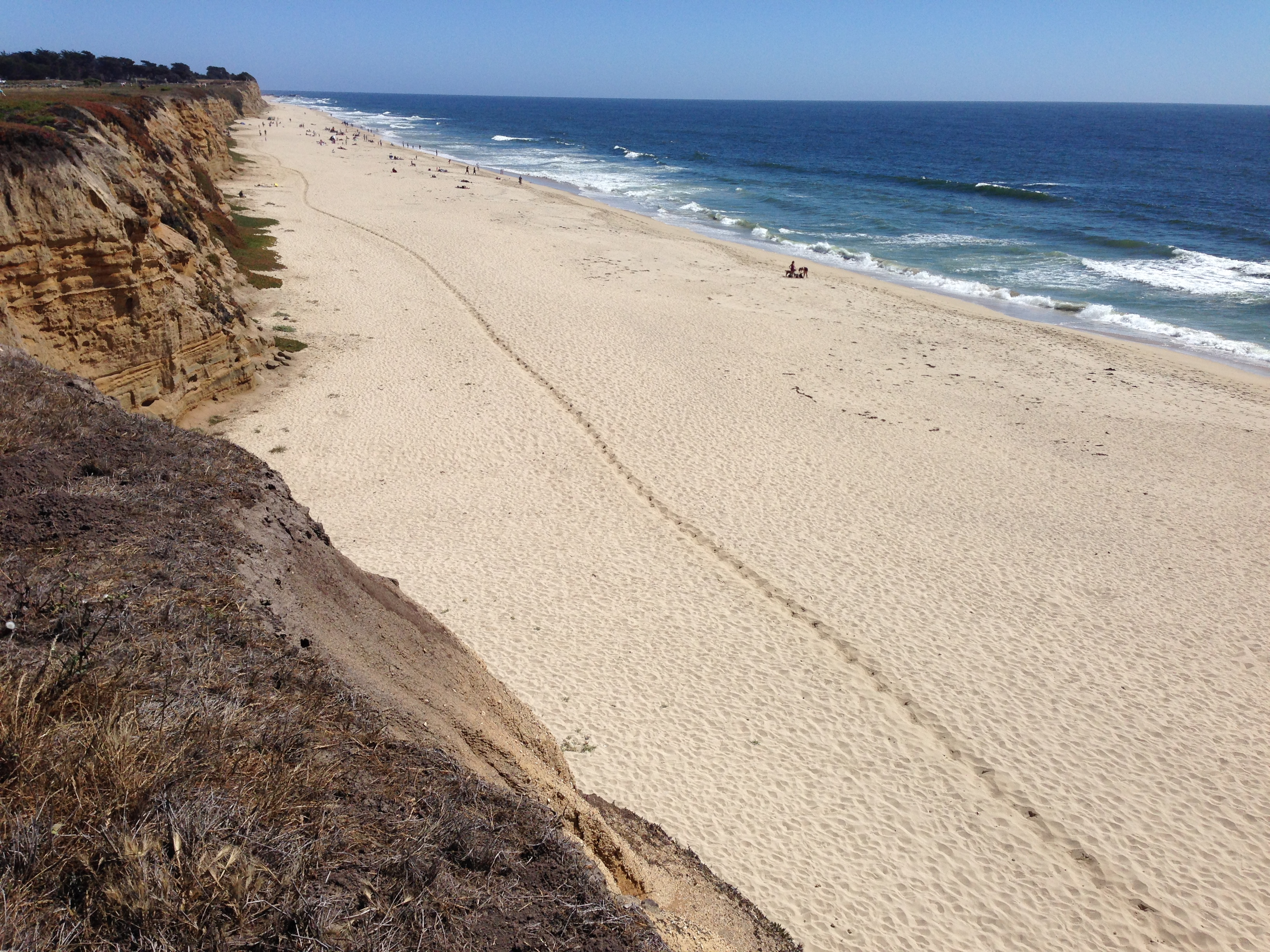
- Horse trail along Poplar Beach

- Location within California Location within the United States
- Location: San Mateo County, California, USA
- Nearest city: Half Moon Bay, California
- Coordinates: 37°27′18.9″N 122°26′41.9″W
- Governing body: Half Moon Bay, California

Poplar Beach is a beach located in and operated by the city of Half Moon Bay, California. It lies at the end of Poplar Street west of State Route 1. Located roughly a half mile south of Half Moon Bay State Beach, Poplar Beach allows horses and leashed dogs. It is close to a residential area, and there are no fireworks or beach fires allowed. Poplar Beach is open until sunset and is free to the public (though the nearest parking lot is metered).

The Coastal Trail links Poplar Beach to Half Moon Bay State Beach along the top of a bluff with scenic views of the Pacific Ocean and the Mavericks surfing location to the north. This hiking trail is also open to horses and dogs.

== See also ==
- Half Moon Bay State Beach
- List of beaches in California
- List of California state parks
