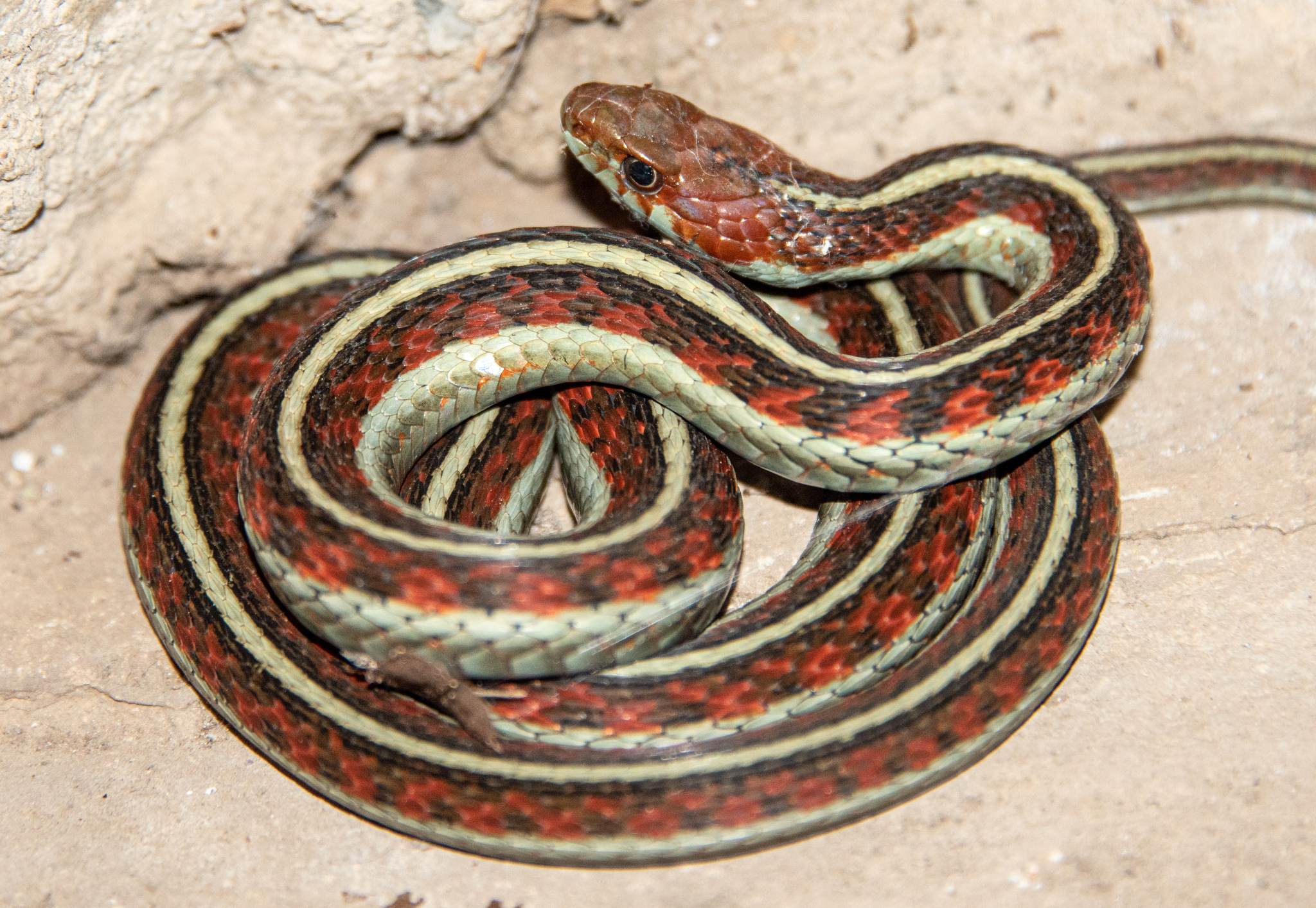
- Thamnophis sirtalis infernalis photographed in Sonoma County, California

Scientific classification
- Kingdom: Animalia
- Phylum: Chordata
- Class: Reptilia
- Order: Squamata
- Suborder: Serpentes
- Family: Colubridae
- Genus: Thamnophis
- Species: T. sirtalis
- Subspecies: T. s. infernalis

Trinomial name
- Thamnophis sirtalis infernalis (Blainville, 1835)

= California red-sided garter snake =

Subspecies of snake

The California red-sided garter snake (Thamnophis sirtalis infernalis) is a subspecies of the common garter snake. This slender subspecies of natricine snake is indigenous to North America and is one of three recognized subspecies of Thamnophis sirtalis found in California. While commonly confused with the subspecies T. s. concinnus, it is biologically part of the population of the subspecies T. s. tetrataenia, as pointed out by Boundy and Rossman (1995), but was preserved as T. s. infernalis as a neotype under ICZN code Article 75 in a 2000 decision by the International Commission on Zoological Nomenclature (ICZN) in 2000 in order to preserve the existing subspecies taxonomy.

Most California red-sided garter snakes have a pattern of blue stripes on a black and red background. Their average total length is about 55 cm (22 in), with a maximum total length of about 100 cm (39 in).

While this snake does produce venom, it is mild and not lethal to humans. It is relatively harmless, though may cause swelling and irritation around the bite wound.

== Description ==
Thamnophis sirtalis infernalis features a basic pattern of three stripes including yellow or blue stripes over a primarily red body, with a row of black spots or blotches appearing in a stripe like pattern with the ground color of the snake being dark olive to black. The underside is bluish gray, sometimes with dark markings. 7, occasionally 8, rarely 6 or 9, upper labial scales, often with black wedges. 10 lower labial scales. The rear pair of chin shields are longer than the front. Average of 19 scales at mid-body. The red can be more or less prominent depending on the specimen but appears in blotches and spots across the body and over the head. In some cases, the red may be less prominent, and the snake appears to be black with red markings. However, T. s. infernalis can be easily distinguished from the San Francisco garter snake (Thamnophis sirtalis tetrataenia), which has similar coloring, as it features red blotching and spots, rather than a single strip of red along the dorsal stripe.

The subspecies features an orange or red head, and can vary significantly in appearance based on the geographical location of the snake.

The California red-sided garter snake is a slender snake that is smaller and lighter than the San Francisco garter snake. Females typically reach 90–100 cm (35-39 inches) while males typically reach 65-75 centimeters (25–29.5), and are markedly thinner than females. While the recorded maximum size for T. sirtalis as a species is 137 cm (53.9 inches), it is uncommon to find a female T. s. infernalis over 100 cm (39.5 inches).

This species has a lifespan of around 12 years.

=== Taxonomy ===
There is some confusion regarding the subspecific name of T. s. infernalis. Boundy and Rossman (1995) pointed out some nomenclature problems with the Pacific Coast populations of Thamnophis sirtalis subspecies. However, the suggestions that the subspecies T. s. tetrataenia be referred to as T. s. infernalis and that the current subspecies T. s. infernalis be included with the subspecies T. s. concinnus were denied by the International Commission on Zoological Nomenclature (ICZN) in 2000, and a neotype for T. s. infernalis was designated to conserve the traditional subspecies taxonomy.

== Distribution and habitat ==
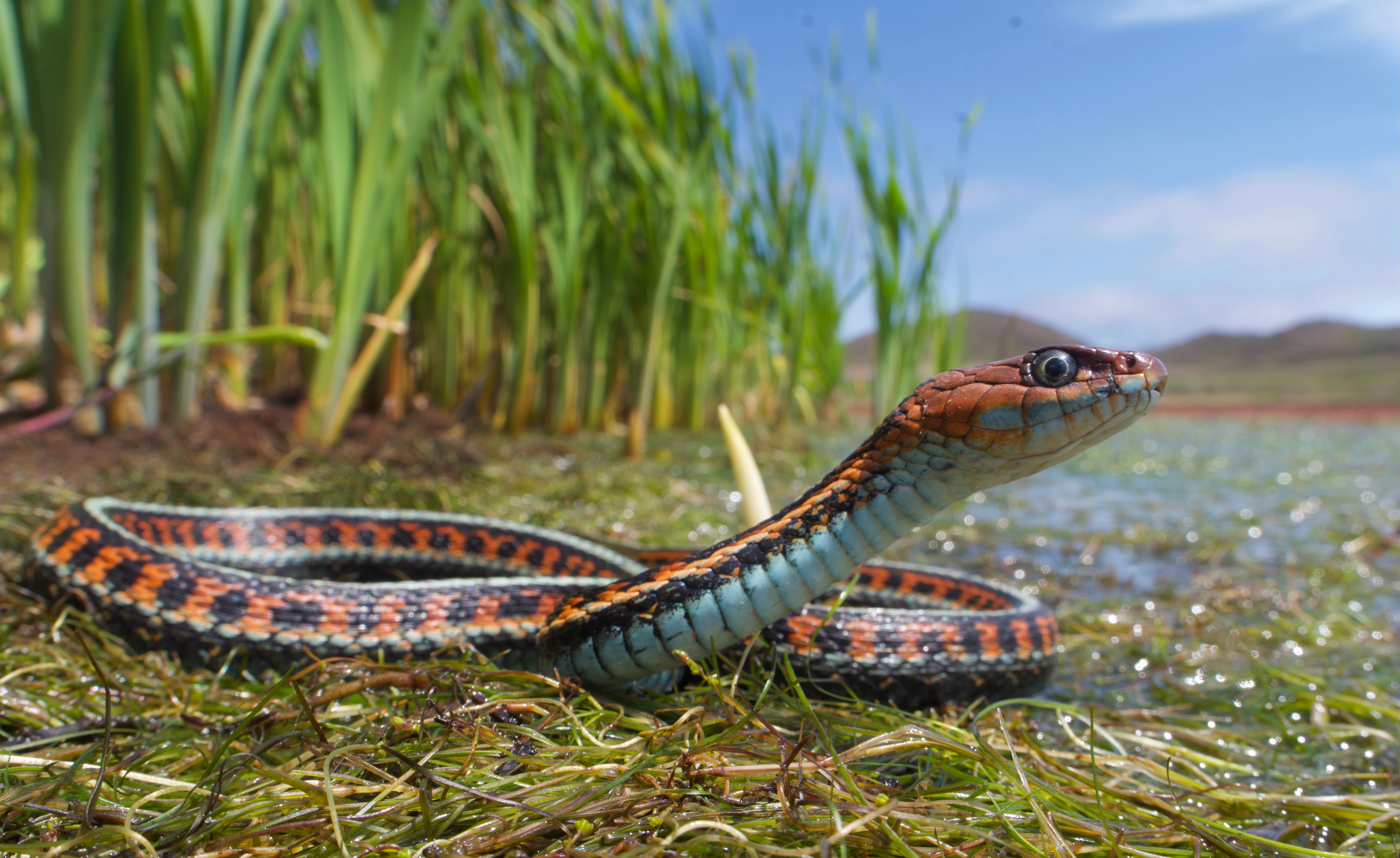
Thamnophis sirtalis infernalis in a marshland habitat, Northern California

Thamnophis sirtalis infernalis occurs throughout California and is found primarily in coastal dunes and marshes. The distribution is disjunct, as it is found ranging from coastal Humboldt County to coastal Monterey County, and is found in conjunction with some San Francisco garter snakes. However, T. s. infernalis was primarily replaced by another subspecies of the common garter snake, the valley garter snake (T. s. fitchi), in southern Monterey, meaning that they are absent from Monterey to Santa Barbara, but present from Santa Barbara to San Diego County. The subspecies was listed as endangered in the U.S. Endangered Species Act (USESA) of 1967, and listed as declining by the United States Fish and Wildlife Services in 1990.

Thamnophis sirtalis infernalis is typically associated with permanent or near-permanent bodies of water such as marshland, shallow water, and dunes. The sag ponds in the San Andreas Fault rift zone and freshwater coastal marshes are their primary habitat. T. s. infernalis also temporarily occurs in grassland and some woodland.

== Behavior ==
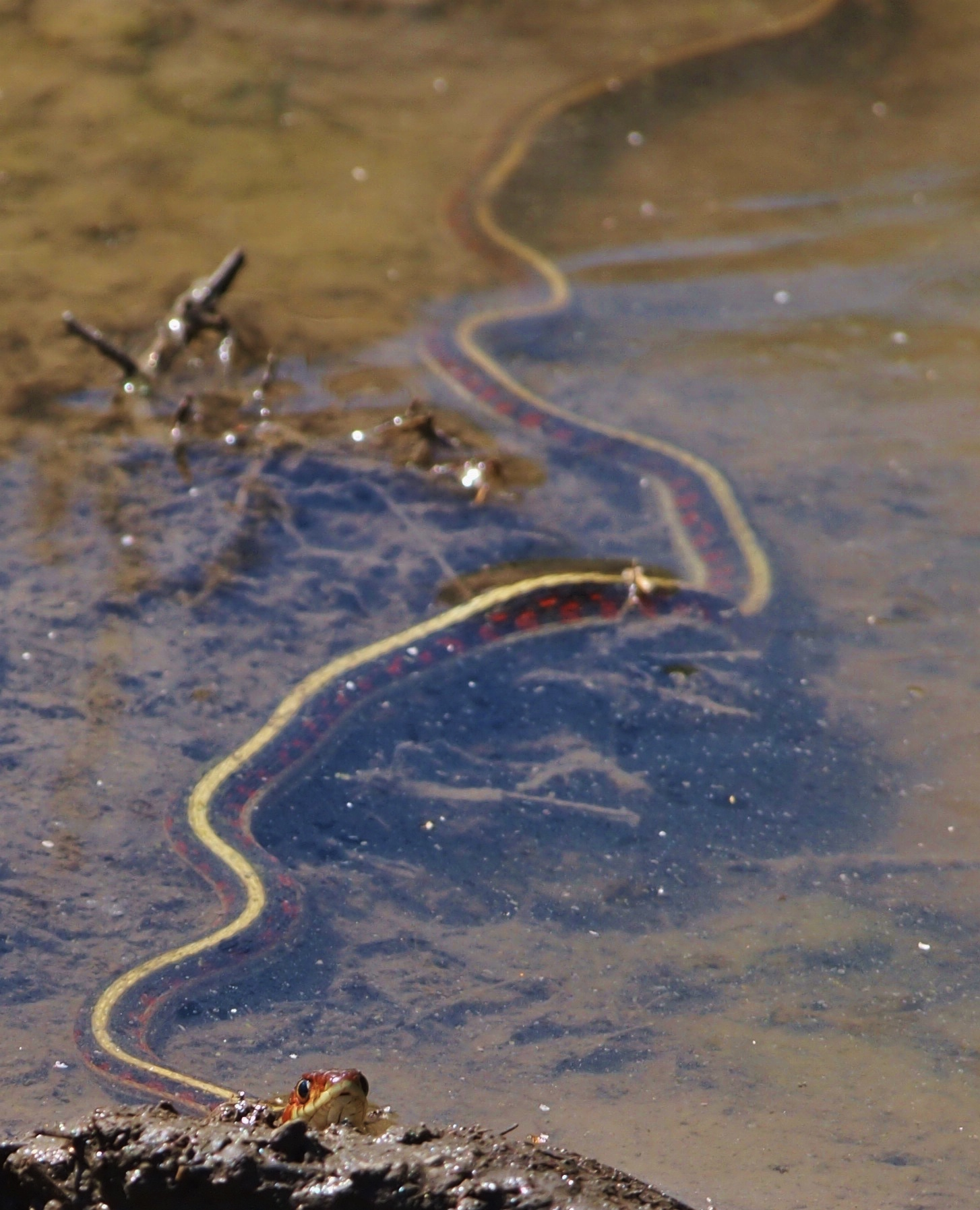
Thamnophis sirtalis infernalis swimming

The species T. sirtalis is capable of activity at lower temperatures than other species of North American snake. Thamnophis sirtalis infernalis are diurnal. They live in marshland and are proficient swimmers and often escape into water when threatened. As juveniles they tend to be fearful and they grow up to be generally passive. When handled,Thamnophis sirtalis infernalis, will musk and release cloacal contents then strike. It appears that newly emerged males may need as much as 2 days to "recover" from the effects of the long winter dormancy. During this time, the snakes are cold, relatively inactive, and weak.

== Reproduction ==
Thamnophis sirtalis infernalis is a viviparous snake, and they mate in the late winter to early spring. Live young are born in the mid-summer to early fall and are typically 12-20 centimeters (5-8 inches) in length. Clutch sizes vary, but typically vary from 8 to 20 young.

Like the red-spotted garter snake (T. s. concinnus), juvenile T. s. infernalis are born with faint colors, which grow increasingly brighter as the snake matures and sheds. Most juveniles are born yellow and become successively more blue as the snake matures and sheds.

Male red-sided garter snakes emerge from winter dormancy and immediately exhibit intense breeding activity that can last as long as 4 to 6 weeks. At emergence, the testes are completely regressed and do not initiate recrudescence until the breeding season has ended. The initiation of sexual behavior in the red-sided garter snake requires a prolonged period of low temperature dormancy followed by exposure to warm temperatures. The intensity at which males exhibit courtship behavior appears to be directly correlated with the length of time males remain in low temperature dormancy.

== Diet ==
The California red-sided garter snake is carnivorous - its diverse diet consists of frogs, newts, larvae, fish, birds, and their eggs, small rodents, reptiles, earthworms, slugs, and leeches. This species is able to eat adult Pacific Newts (genus Taricha) which are deadly poisonous to most predators. Newt toxicity varying by location and snake resistance to the toxin also varying by location. Some of their known predators include raccoons, squirrels, foxes, as well as larger birds, snakes and fish. Thamnophis sirtalis infernalis plays a crucial role in their ecosystem, especially with helping control the population of their prey.
