= Madonna Creek =

River in California, United States

Coordinates: 37.475218°N 122.41303°W

Madonna Creek is a 2.5-mile-long (4.0 km) stream in San Mateo County, California, USA, which is a tributary of Pilarcitos Creek.

== See also ==
- List of watercourses in the San Francisco Bay Area
