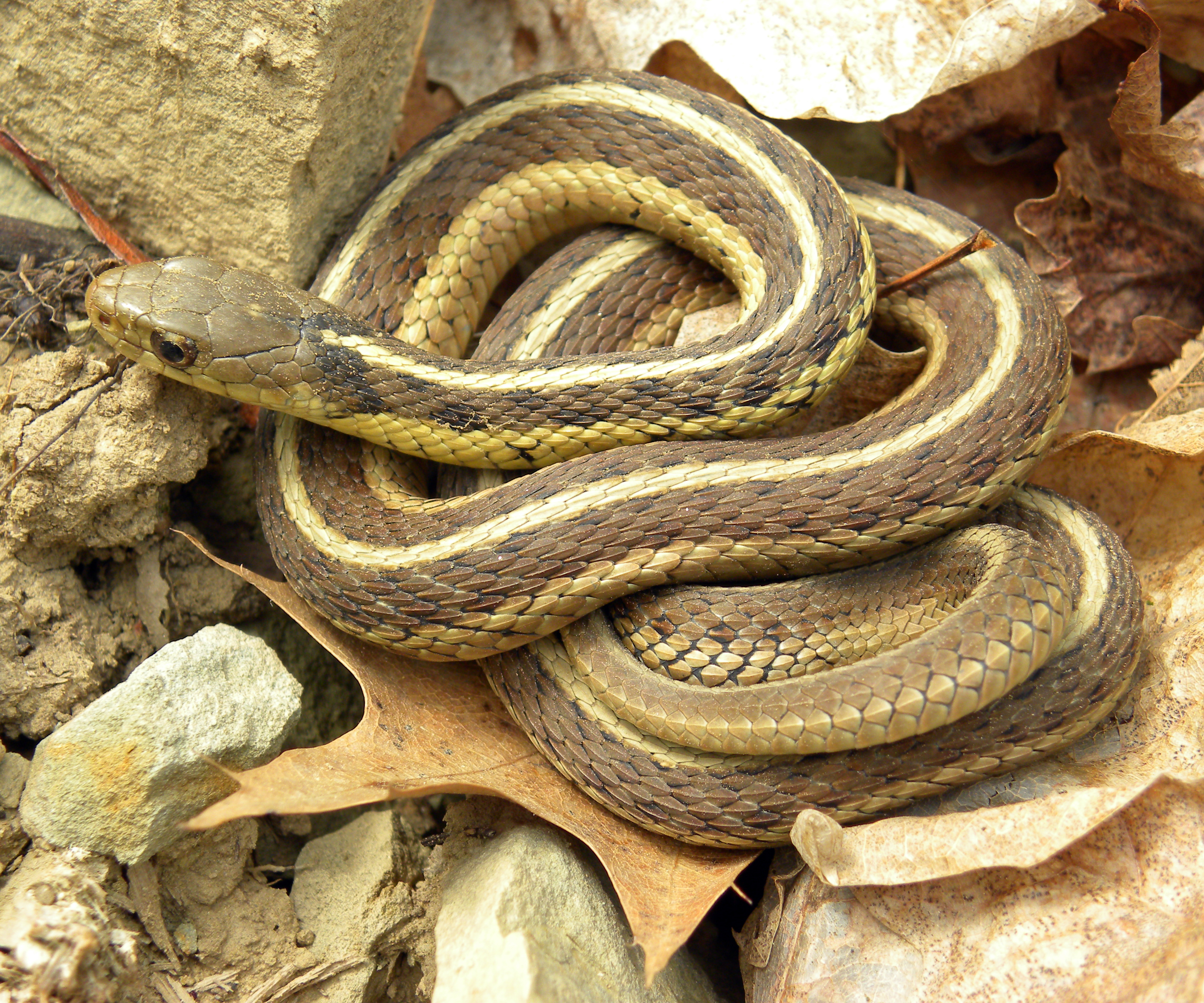
- Eastern garter snake (Thamnophis sirtalis sirtalis)

Conservation status
- Least Concern (IUCN 3.1)

Scientific classification
- Kingdom: Animalia
- Phylum: Chordata
- Class: Reptilia
- Order: Squamata
- Suborder: Serpentes
- Family: Colubridae
- Genus: Thamnophis
- Species: T. sirtalis

Binomial name
- Thamnophis sirtalis (Linnaeus, 1758)

Subspecies
- 12 sspp., see text
- Range of T. s. pickeringii Range of T. s. fitchi Range of T. s. concinnus Range of T. s. infernalis Range of T. s. tetrataenia Range of T. s. parietalis Range of T. s. dorsalis Range of T. s. annectens Range of T. s. sirtalis Range of T. s. pallidulus Range of T. s. semifasciatus Range of T. s. similis Range of Intergrade zones

Synonyms
- Coluber sirtalis Linnaeus, 1758; Tropidonotus sirtalis — Holbrook, 1842; Tropidonotus ordinatus — Holbrook, 1842; Eutainia sirtalis — Baird & Girard, 1853; Eutænia sirtalis — Cope, 1875; Thamnophis sirtalis — Garman, 1892

= Common garter snake =

Species of snake

The common garter snake (Thamnophis sirtalis) is a species of snake in the subfamily Natricinae of the family Colubridae. The species is indigenous to North America and found widely across the continent. There are several recognized subspecies. Most common garter snakes have a pattern of yellow stripes on a black, brown or green background, and their average total length (including tail) is about 55 cm (22 in), with a maximum total length of about 137 cm (54 in). The average body mass is 150 g (5.3 oz). The common garter snake is the state reptile of Massachusetts.

== Taxonomy and etymology ==
The subspecific name fitchi is in honor of the American herpetologist Henry Sheldon Fitch.

The subspecific name pickeringii is in honor of the American naturalist Charles E. Pickering.

=== Subspecies ===
Current scientific classification recognizes 12 subspecies (ordered by date):

Image	Subspecies	Distribution
	T. s. sirtalis (Linnaeus, 1758) – eastern garter snake	eastern North America
	T. s. parietalis (Say, 1823) – red-sided garter snake	as far north as Fort Smith, Northwest Territories, and as far south as the Oklahoma-Texas border
	T. s. infernalis (Blainville, 1835) – California red-sided garter snake	California coast
	T. s. concinnus (Hallowell, 1852) – red-spotted garter snake	northwestern Oregon and southwestern Washington
	T. s. dorsalis (Baird & Girard, 1853) – New Mexico garter snake	Mexico and southern New Mexico.
	T. s. pickeringii (Baird & Girard, 1853) – Puget Sound garter snake	Northwestern Washington, Vancouver Island and the southwestern British Columbia
	T. s. tetrataenia (Cope, 1875) – San Francisco garter snake (endangered)	San Mateo County, California
	T. s. semifasciatus (Cope, 1892) – Chicago garter snake	Chicago, Illinois
	T. s. pallidulus Allen, 1899 – maritime garter snake	northeastern New England, Quebec, and the Maritime provinces.
	T. s. annectens B.C. Brown, 1950 – Texas garter snake	Texas, Oklahoma and Kansas
	T. s. fitchi Fox, 1951 – valley garter snake	Rocky Mountains and interior ranges
	T. s. similis Rossman, 1965 – blue-striped garter snake	northwestern peninsular Florida

A trinomial authority in parentheses indicates that the subspecies was originally described in a genus other than Thamnophis.

== Anatomy and description ==
Common garter snakes are thin snakes. Few grow over about 4 ft (1.2 m) long, and most stay smaller. Most have longitudinal stripes in many different colors. Common garter snakes come in a wide range of colors, including green, blue, yellow, gold, red, orange, brown, and black.

=== Venom ===
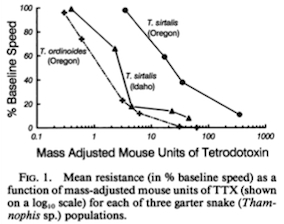
Tetrodotoxin effects in garter snakes

Garter snakes have a mild venom in their saliva, which may be toxic to the amphibians and other small animals that they prey upon. For humans, a bite is not dangerous, and many handlers can attest to garter snakes gently biting in protest when held or restrained; these bites do not often break the skin, given the garter snake's smaller size, but may cause slight itching, burning, and/or swelling at the location of the bite. However, it is more likely that, prior to expending their energy through biting, garter snakes will secrete a foul-smelling fluid ("musk", "musking", "skunking") from postanal glands.

Common garter snakes are resistant to naturally occurring poisons in their prey, such as that of the American toad and rough-skinned newt, the latter of which can kill a human if ingested. Garter snakes (in addition to their own mildly venomous saliva) have the ability to retain poisons from their consumed amphibian prey, thus making them poisonous and deterring any would-be predators.

The common garter snake uses toxicity for both offense and defense. On the offensive side, the snake's venom can be toxic to some of its smaller prey, such as mice and other rodents. On the defensive side, the snake uses its resistance to toxicity to provide an important antipredator capability. A study on the evolutionary development of resistance of tetrodotoxin compared two populations of Thamnophis and then tested inside a population of T. sirtalis. Those that were exposed to and lived in the same environment as the newts (Taricha granulosa) or rough-skinned newt, that produce tetrodotoxin when eaten were more immune to the toxin (see figure).It seems that the two species were in an evolutionary arms race.

While resistance to tetrodotoxin is beneficial in acquiring newt prey, costs are associated with it as well. Consuming the toxin can lead to reduced speed and sometimes no movement for extended periods of time, along with impaired thermoregulation. The antipredator display that this species uses demonstrates the idea of an "arms race" between different species and their antipredator displays. Along the entire geographical interaction of T. granulosa and T. sirtalis, patches occur that correspond to strong coevolution, as well as weak or absent coevolution. Populations of T. sirtalis that do not live in areas that contain T. granulosa contain the lowest levels of tetrodotoxin resistance, while those that do live in the same area have the highest levels of tetrodotoxin resistance. In populations where tetrodotoxin is absent in T. granulosa, resistance in T. sirtalis is selected against because the mutation causes lower average population fitness. This helps maintain polymorphism within garter snake populations.

== Habitat ==
The habitat of the common garter snake ranges from forests, fields, and prairies to streams, wetlands, meadows, marshes, and ponds, and it is often found near water. Depending on the subspecies, the common garter snake can be found as far south the southernmost tip of Florida in the United States and as far north as the southernmost tip of the Northwest Territories in Canada. It is found at altitudes from sea level to mountains.

== Behavior and life history ==
The common garter snake is a diurnal snake. In summer, it is most active in the morning and late afternoon; in cooler seasons or climates, it restricts its activity to the warm afternoons.

In warmer southern areas, the snake is active year-round; otherwise, it sleeps in common dens, sometimes in great numbers. On warm winter afternoons, some snakes have been observed emerging from their hibernacula to bask in the sun.

=== Antipredatory displays ===
Garter snakes exhibit many different behaviors to ward off predators. Garter snakes exhibit a greater variety of body postures than other snakes. Under selection by predation, these snakes have developed postural responses that are highly variable and heritable. These are highly variable even within a single population. Different postures indicate whether the snake is preparing to flee, fight, or protect itself. Different biological factors such as body temperature and sex also influence whether the snake exhibits certain antipredatory behaviors.

The warmer the temperature of a garter snake, the more likely the snake is to flee a predator; a snake with a cooler body temperature is more likely to remain stationary or attack. Male garter snakes are also more likely to flee. Garter snakes that exhibit more aggressive antipredatory displays tend to also be fast and have high stamina. However, the reason for this correlation is unknown.

The first response of the snake to a predator is often a bluff. When the snake was teased with a finger under laboratory conditions, the snake reacted aggressively, but once touched, it became passive. This may be because the snake is disinclined to attack an organism it sees as larger than itself. Garter snakes do not exhibit mimicry or aposematic coloration; relying on cryptic coloration for protection, they will freeze until they know they are spotted, then attempt a stealthy departure.

The decision of a juvenile garter snake to attack a predator can be affected by whether the snake has just eaten or not. Snakes that have just eaten are more likely to strike a predator or stimulus than snakes that do not have a full stomach. Snakes that have just eaten a large animal are less mobile.

Another factor that controls the antipredatory response of the garter snake is where on its body the snake is attacked. Many birds and mammals prefer to attack the head of the snake. Garter snakes are more likely to hide their heads and move their tails back and forth when being attacked close to the head. Snakes that are attacked in the middles of their bodies are more likely to flee or exhibit open-mouthed warning reactions.

Age may be another factor that contributes to antipredatory responses. As garter snakes mature, the length of time for which they can engage in physical activity at 25 °C increases. Juvenile snakes can only be physically active for 3–5 minutes. Adult snakes can be physically active for up to 25 minutes. This is mostly due to aerobic energy production; pulmonary aeration increases up to three times in adult garter snakes when compared to juveniles. The quick fatigue of the juveniles limits the habitats they can live in, as well as their food sources. It also affects the antipredator response of both juvenile and adult garter snakes; without sufficient energy production, the snake cannot effect an antipredatory response.

=== Reproduction ===
Generally, populations include far more males than females, so during mating season, they form "mating balls", in which one or two females are completely swamped by ten or more males. Sometimes a male snake mates with a female before hibernation, and the female stores the sperm internally until spring, when she allows her eggs to be fertilized. If she mates again in the spring, the fall sperm degenerate and the spring sperm fertilize her eggs. The females may give birth ovoviviparously to 12 to 40 young from July through October.

In the early part of the mating season, when snakes are coming out of hibernation, the males generally emerge first to be ready when the females wake up. Some males assume the role of a female and lead other males away from the burrow, luring them with a fake female pheromone. After such a male has led rivals away, he "turns" back into a male and races back to the den, just as the females emerge. He is then the first to mate with all the females he can catch. This method also serves to help warm males by tricking other males into surrounding and heating up the male, and is particularly useful to subspecies in colder climates (such as those inhabited by T. s. parietalis); this type of mimicry is primarily found in that subspecies. These deceptive males have been found to mate with females significantly more often than males that do not exhibit this mimicry.

== Ecology ==
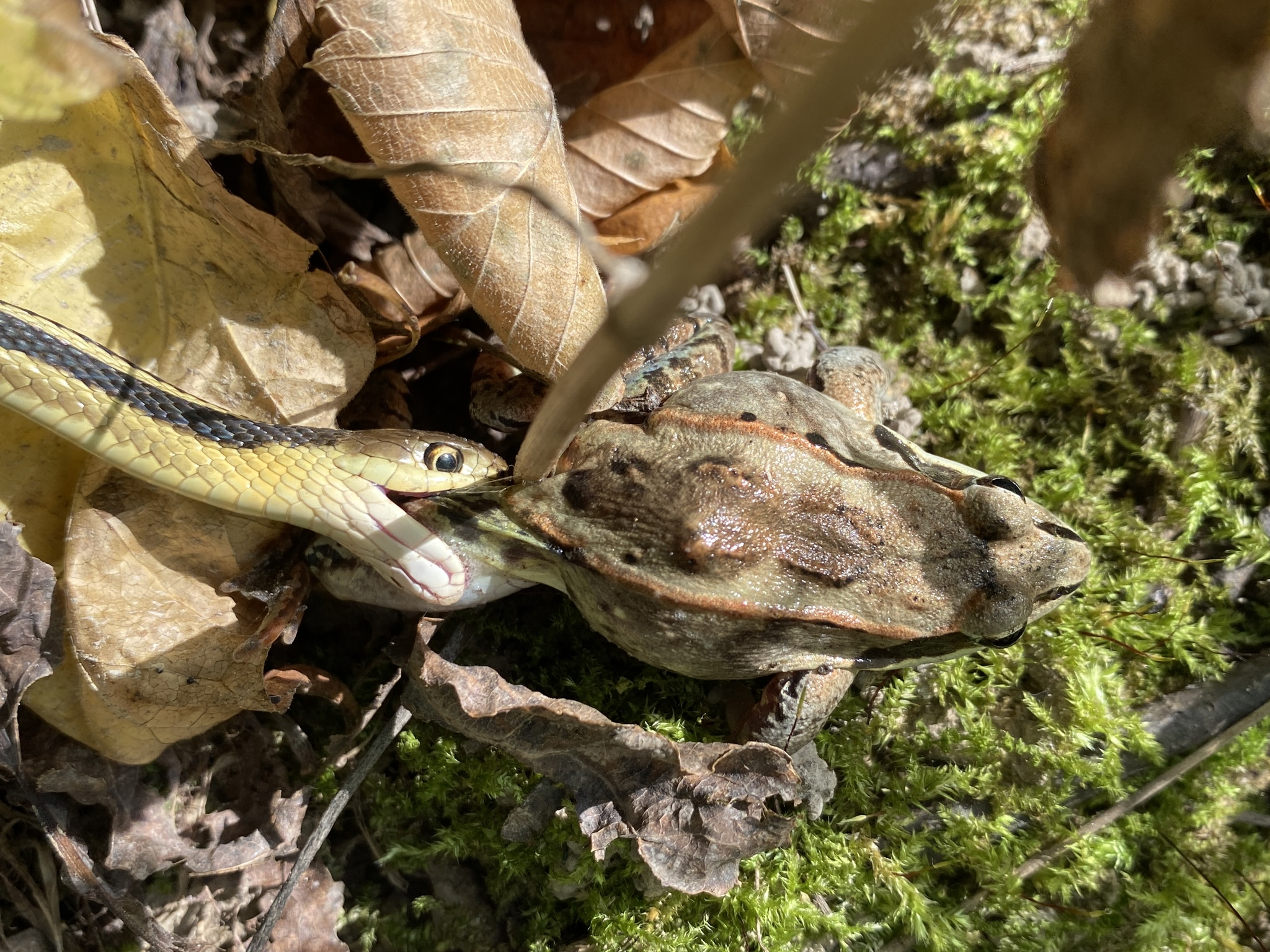
Eating a wood frog, in Minnesota

=== Hunting and diet ===
The diet of T. sirtalis consists mainly of amphibians and earthworms, but also leeches, slugs, snails, insects, crayfish, fish, lizards, other snakes, small birds, and rodents. Common garter snakes are effective at catching fast-moving creatures such as fish and tadpoles.

=== Natural predators ===
Animals that prey on the common garter snake include large fish (such as bass and catfish), American bullfrogs, common snapping turtles, larger snakes, hawks, raccoons, foxes, wild turkeys, and domestic cats and dogs.

== Conservation status ==
The common garter snake is considered to be a least-concern species by the IUCN Red List due to its wide distribution and high population size. Water contamination, urban expansion, and residential and industrial development are all threats to the common garter snake. The San Francisco garter snake (T. s. tetrataenia), which is extremely scarce and occurs only in the vicinity of ponds and reservoirs in San Mateo County, California, has been listed as an endangered species by the U.S. Fish and Wildlife Service since 1967.

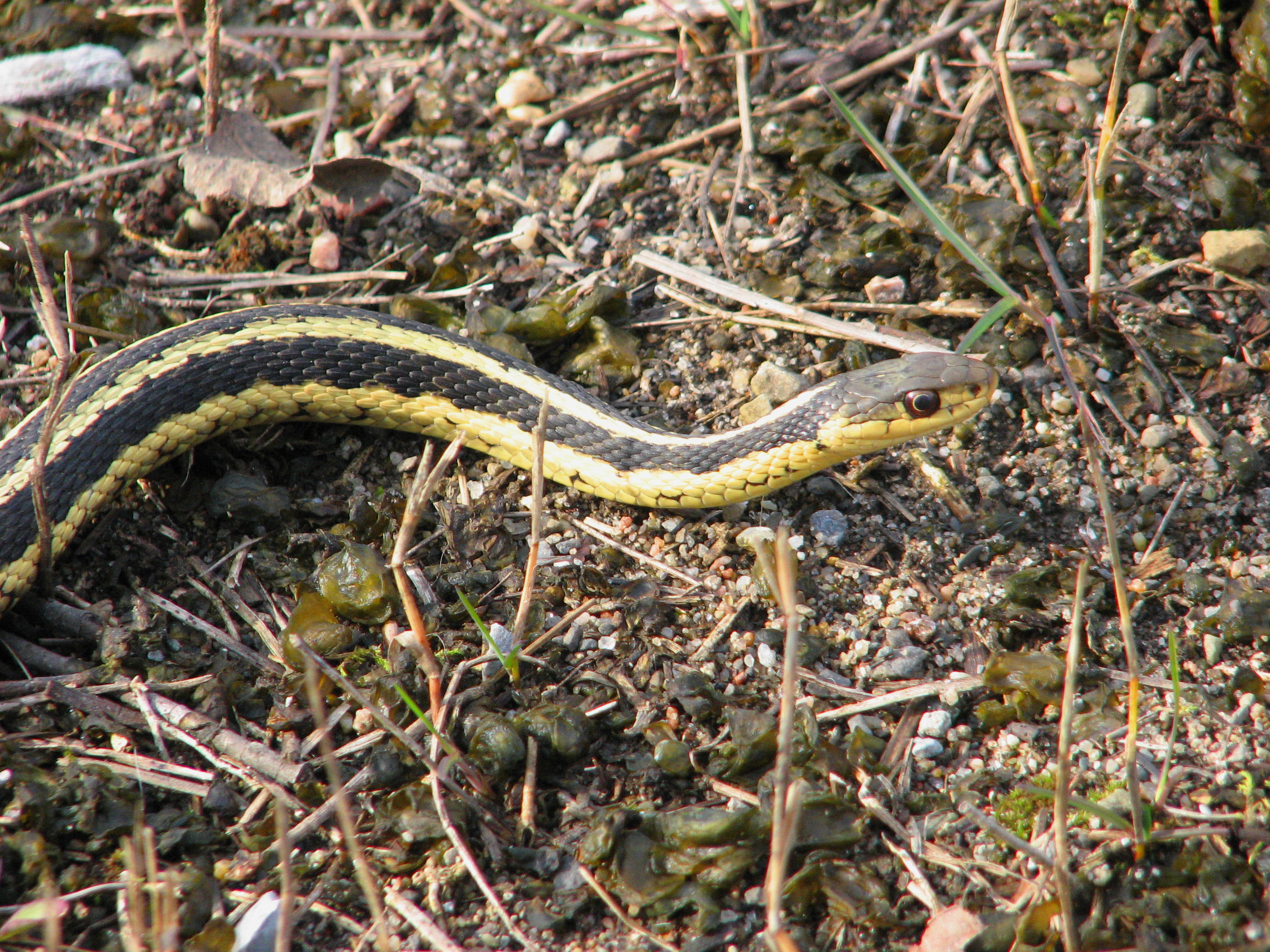
T. s. sirtalis (Ontario specimen)

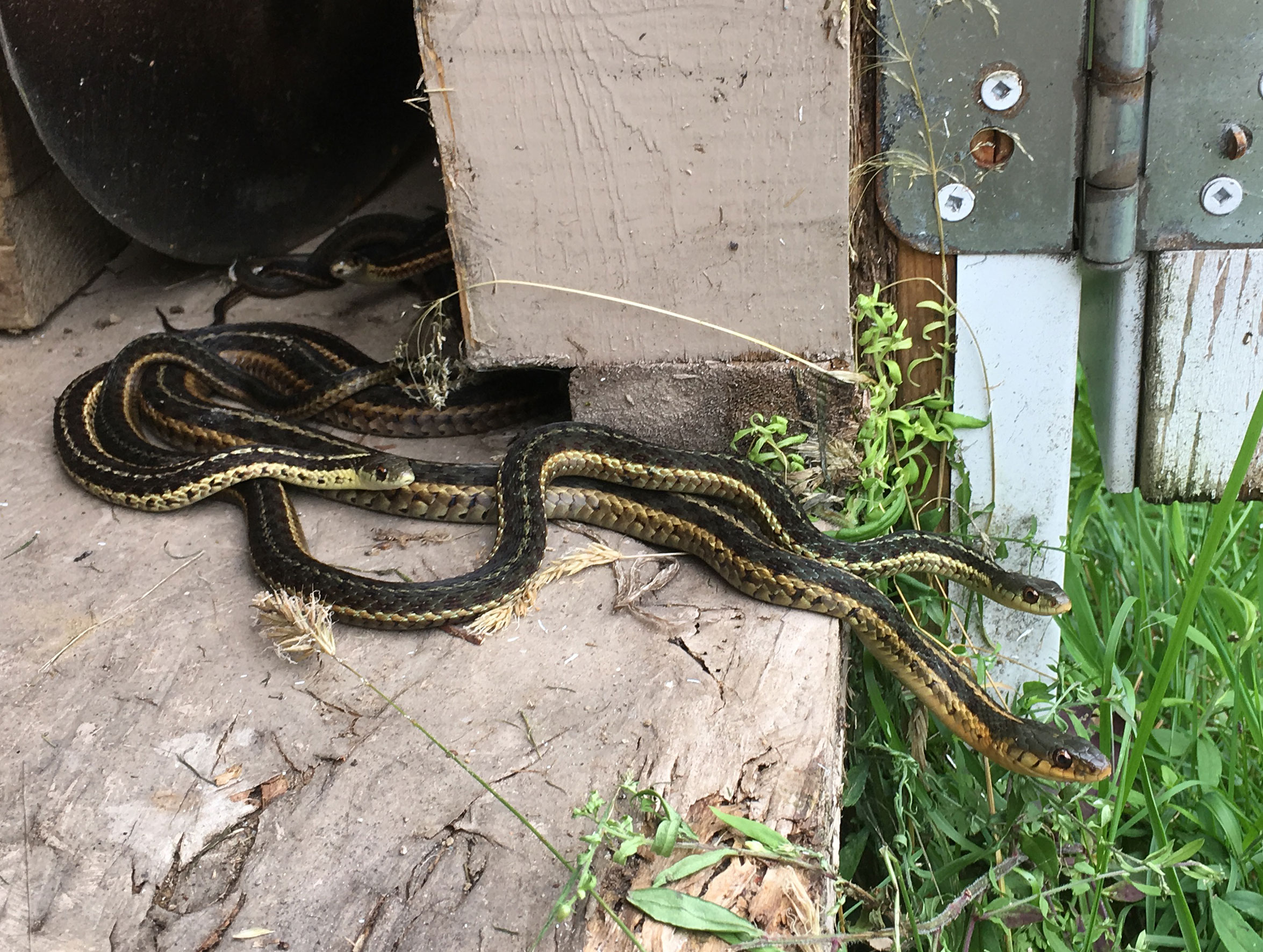
T. s. sirtalis (Quebec, Canada)

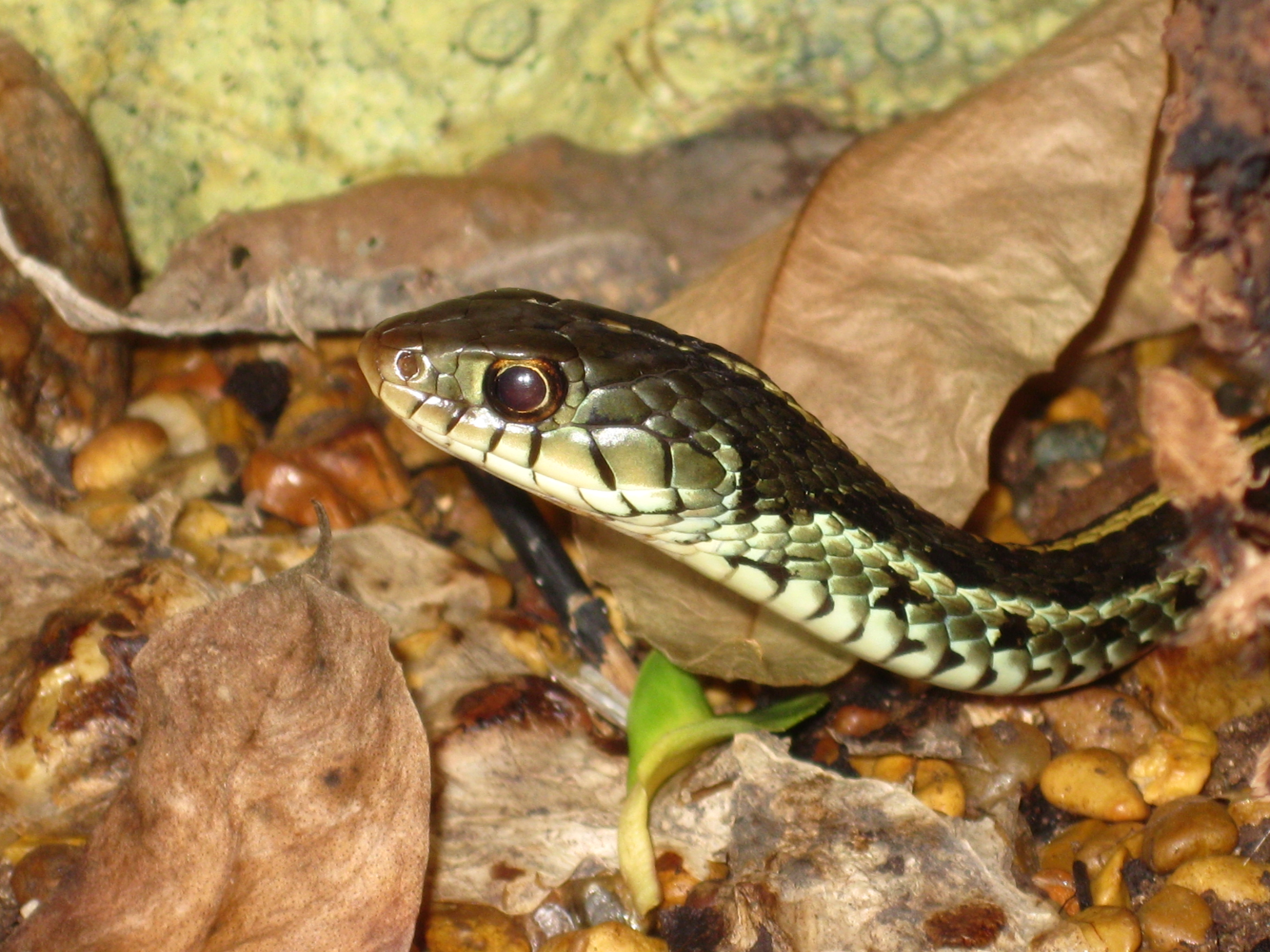
T. s. sirtalis (Florida specimen)

== See also ==
- Narcisse Snake Dens
- Inger R.F. (1946). "Restriction of the type locality of Thamnophis sirtalis". Copeia. 1946 (4): 254. doi:10.2307/1438115. JSTOR 1438115.
