= Miramar, Half Moon Bay, California =

Coordinates: 37°29′35″N 122°27′24″W

Miramar (Spanish for "Sea View") is a district located within the city limits of Half Moon Bay in San Mateo County, California. Miramar Beach is located at Miramar. The east side of Highway 1 and north of the middle of Mirada road is in unincorporated San Mateo County.
