= Grus (geology) =

Sand and gravel fragments accumulation

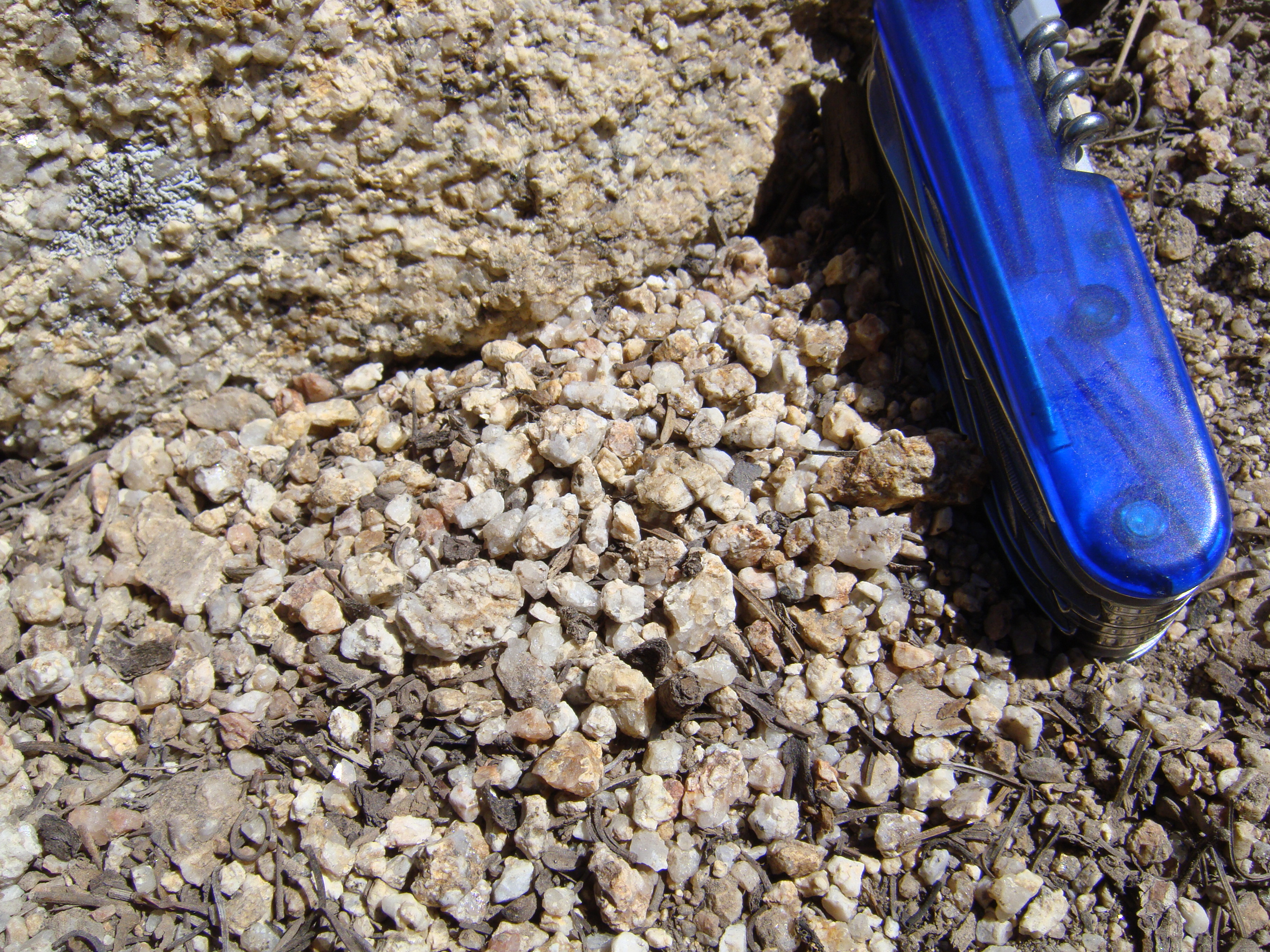
Grus sand and granitoid

Grus is an accumulation of angular, coarse-grained fragments (particles of sand and gravel) resulting from the granular disintegration by the processes of chemical and mechanical weathering of crystalline rocks (most notably granitoids), generally in an arid or semiarid region. Grus sand, when cemented into a sandstone, will form an arkose.

Within a European context most of the saprolite mantles of Late Cenozoic age are made up of grus, contrasting with Mesozoic and Early Cenozoic saprolites made up of kaolinitic and ferrallitic material.

== See also ==
- Exfoliation – Type of weathering joint
- Saprolite – Chemically weathered rock
