= Decomposed granite =

Weathered and crumbling granite rock

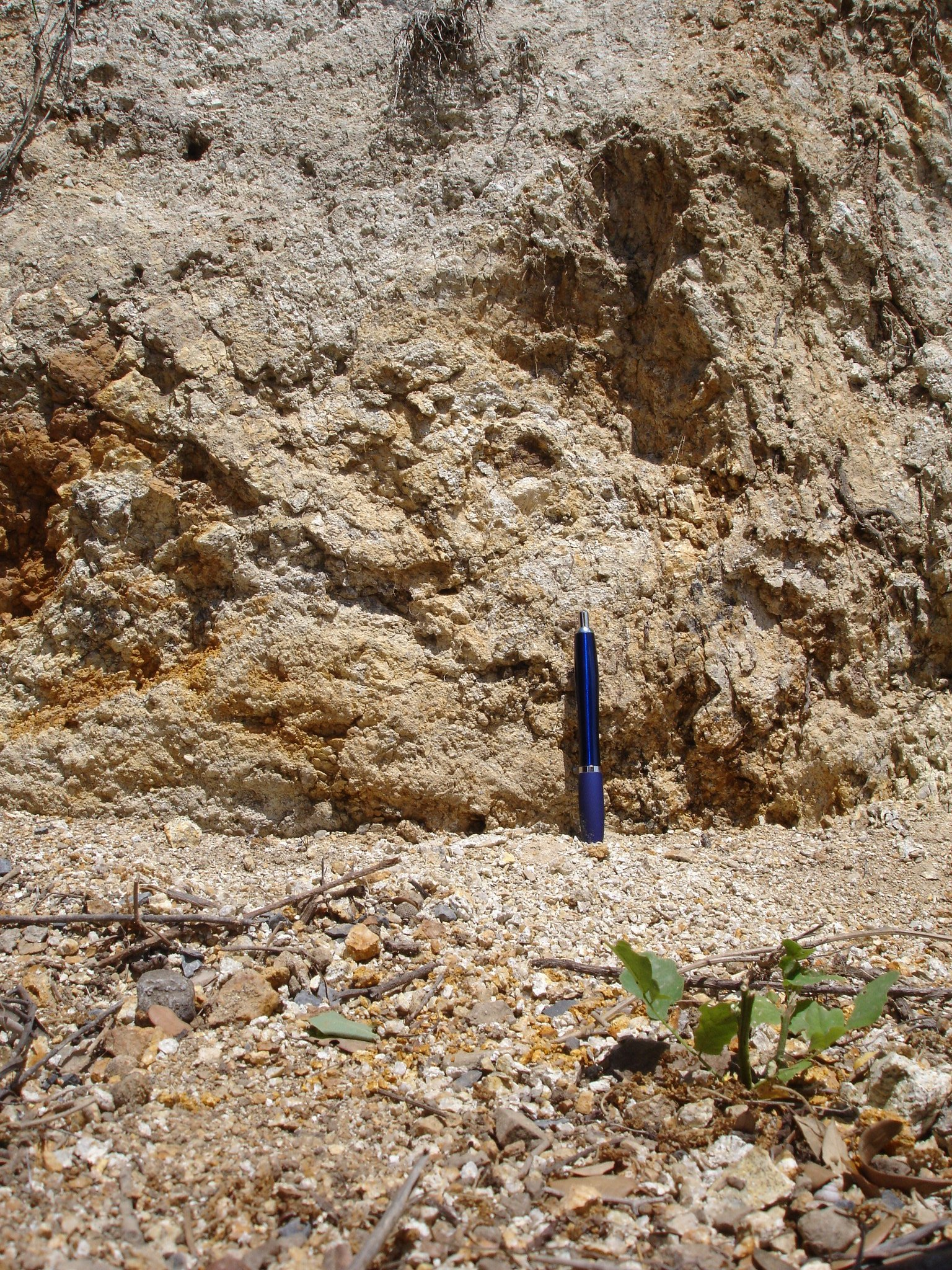
Targasonne granite breaks down into decomposed granite and "grus" ("granite pourri," rotten granite, and "arène granitique," granitic sand), at the "Chaos" (moraine of the same name, near Font-Romeu-Odeillo-Via in the southern French département (county) of Pyrénées-Orientales.

Decomposed granite is granite rock that has weathered to the point where it readily fractures into smaller pieces of weaker rock. Further weathering yields material that easily crumbles into gravel-sized particles known as "grus", which may then break down further to produce a mixture of clay and silica sand or silt particles. Different granite types weather at different rates, so their likelihood of producing decomposed granite varies. Its practical uses include incorporation into paving materials for roads and driveways, residential gardening materials in arid environments, and various types of walkways and heavy-use paths in parks. Decomposed granite is available in various colours, originating from the natural spectrum of granite hues from different quarry sources. An admixture of other natural or synthetic materials can broaden the range of decomposed granite properties.

== Composition ==
The parent granite material is a common type of igneous rock that is granular, with its grains large enough to be distinguished with the unaided eye (i.e., it is phaneritic in texture); it is composed of plagioclase feldspar, orthoclase feldspar, quartz, mica, and possibly other minerals. The chemical transformation of feldspar, one of the primary constituents of granite, into the clay mineral kaolin is one of the important weathering processes. The presence of clay allows water to seep in and further weaken the rock allowing it to fracture or crumble into smaller particles, where, ultimately, the grains of silica produced from the granite are relatively resistant to weathering, and may remain almost unaltered.

== Uses ==
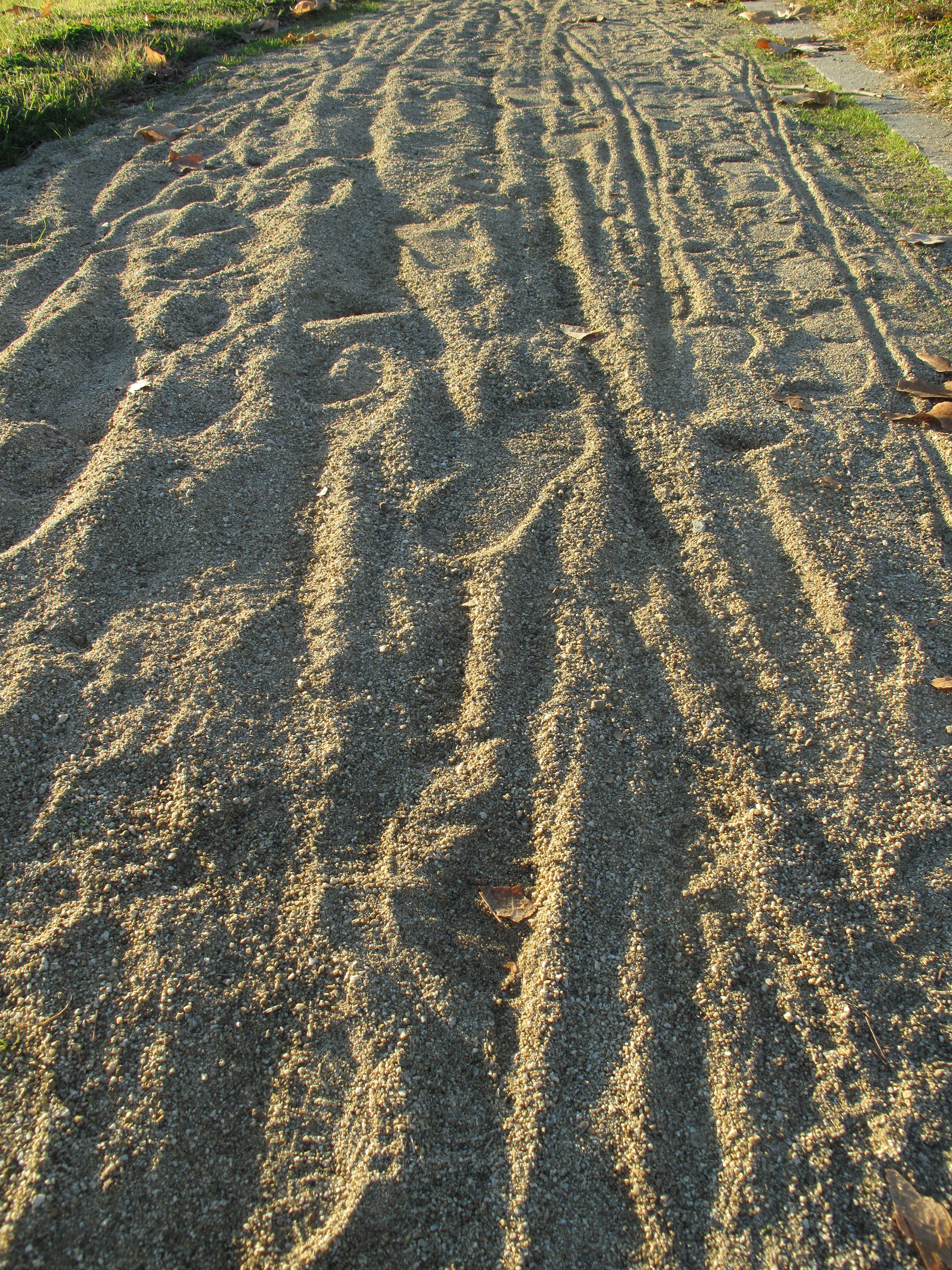
Decomposed granite path

Decomposed granite, as a crushed stone form, is used as a pavement building material. It is used on driveways, garden walkways, bocce courts and pétanque terrains, and urban, regional, and national park walkways and heavy-use paths. Decomposed granite can be installed and compacted to meet accessibility specifications and criteria. Different colors are available based on the various natural ranges available from different quarry sources, and polymeric stabilizers and other additives can be included to change the properties of the natural material. Decomposed granite is also sometimes used as a component of soil mixtures for cultivating bonsai.

== See also ==
- Crushed rock
- Chipseal
