= Half Moon Bay State Beach =

Group of beaches in San Mateo County, California

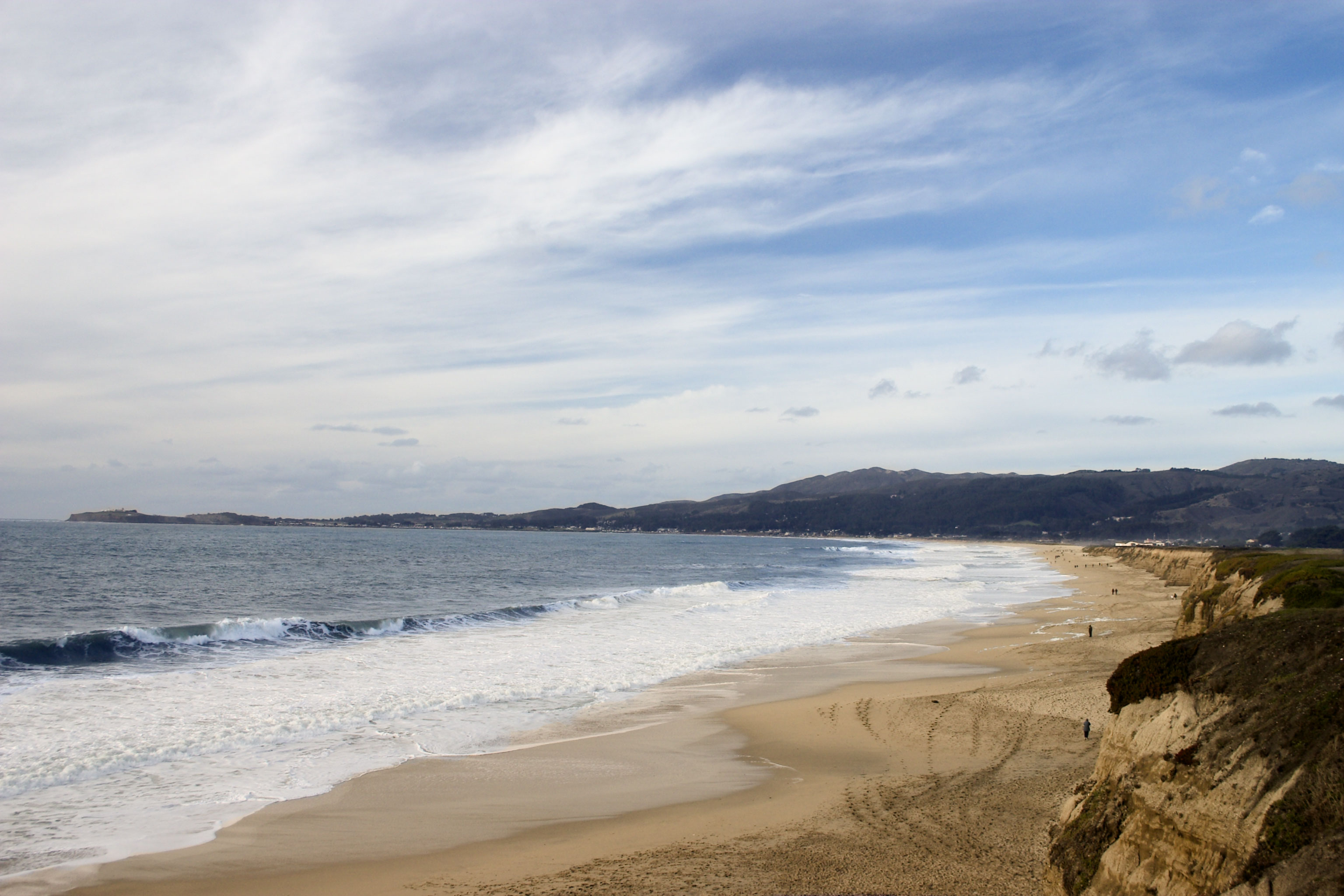
- Half Moon Bay State Beach

- Location within California Location within the United States
- Location: San Mateo County, California, United States
- Nearest city: Half Moon Bay, California
- Coordinates: 37°28′26″N 122°26′55″W
- Area: 181 acres (73 ha)
- Established: 1956
- Governing body: California Department of Parks and Recreation

Half Moon Bay State Beach is a 4-mile (6 km) stretch of protected beaches in the state park system of California, United States, on Half Moon Bay. From north to south it comprises Roosevelt, Dunes, Venice, and Francis Beaches. The 181-acre (73 ha) park was established in 1956.

== Recreation ==
The broad, sandy beaches are used for sunbathing, fishing and picnicking. A campground provides accommodations for those who wish to visit longer. This Pacific Ocean beach, located immediately south of Pillar Point Harbor and the town of Princeton-by-the-Sea, is often used by surfers, who utilize its unusual waves that are influenced by reflective action from the harbor jetty. At the north end of the bay there is a county park in the lee of Pillar Point Harbor with a well-maintained trail that allows hikers and bikers access to the ocean below the point. Some of the tallest surf in California occurs offshore of Pillar Point following big storms. The area is well known as Mavericks and is famous for the annual Mavericks Surf Contest.

Francis Beach has a campground with 52 individual sites; some sites are more suitable for tent camping, others for trailers or recreational vehicles. RV hookups are not available, but there is a dump station.

== History ==
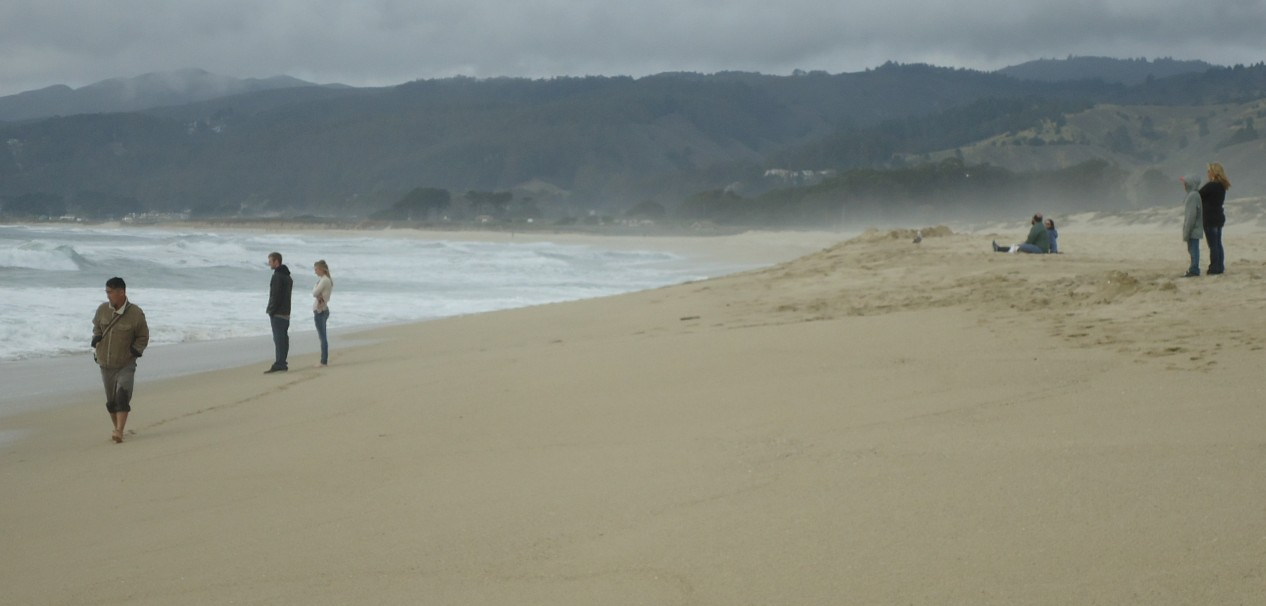
Beachgoers at Francis Beach

The Native American Ohlone people lived along the San Mateo County coast for many thousands of years, in small and scattered villages because of the limited availability of food. The native way of life rapidly changed during the late 18th century when the first Europeans arrived.

The first European land exploration of Alta California, the Spanish Portolà expedition, passed through the area on its way north, camping on October 28–29, 1769, near the shore either at Frenchman Creek or Pilarcitos Creek, both of which reach the bay along this beach. Franciscan missionary Juan Crespi described nearby Pillar Point in his diary: "In this place there are many geese, and for this reason the soldiers named it the plain of 'Los Ansares'. From the camp the...point lies to the north-northwest, and the high rocks look like two thick Farallones [rocky islands] of an irregular and pointed shape."

With the founding of Mission San Francisco de Asís (commonly known as "Mission Dolores") in 1776, the San Mateo coastal area came into use for the grazing of mission livestock. Following secularization of the missions in 1834, most mission lands were subdivided into large grants called ranchos. Cattle ranching was the primary agricultural activity, and the hide and tallow trade was the main economic activity. South of Pilarcitos Creek, the beach was part of Rancho Miramontes, granted in 1841. To the north of Pilarcitos Creek was Rancho Corral de Tierra (Vasquez), granted in 1839.

The first Americans arrived in this area in the 1850s. The Mexican settlement known as Spanishtown, a commercial center for the rancheros, was called "Halfmoon" by these Anglos; the bay itself was named "Halfmoon" due to its shape. In 1867 the local post office was identified as "Halfmoon Bay", and the spelling was changed to Half Moon Bay in 1905. Agriculture had developed in Half Moon Bay by the turn of the 20th century, with crops such as brussels sprouts, artichokes, and mushrooms along with dairy products. The Ocean Shore Railroad was incorporated in 1905 and was running along the coast from Half Moon Bay to San Francisco by the end of 1908.

During the 1920s, the gentle beaches of Half Moon Bay were ideally suited to the needs of the bootlegger. Rum ships cruised offshore, unloading millions of dollars' worth of illegal booze across Half Moon Bay, where Francis Beach was a perfect spot for unloading the cargo.

During World War II, an Army post was set up at the beach to protect from Japanese invasion and bombing raids; further north, bunkers and long-range cannons were built to support the coastline.

== Wildlife ==
Half Moon Bay State Beach is well known for its rare western snowy plover colony.

A variety of fish species have been identified in the marine environment, the most abundant fish including flatfish, the commercially important English sole, rockfish, surfperch, Pacific herring, lingcod, herring; and abundant winter species, including starry flounder and top-smelts.

Marine mammals

- California sea lion
- Steller sea lion
- Harbor seal
- Northern fur seal
- Elephant seal
- Dolphin
- Gray whale
- Humpback whale
- Blue whale

Land mammals

- Raccoon
- California vole
- European rabbit
- Skunk
- Opossum
- Long-tailed weasel
- Gray fox
- Coyote
- Mule deer
- Mountain lion

Birds

- Hen harrier
- Great blue heron
- Kestrel
- White-tailed kite
- Red-tailed hawk
- Killdeer
- Sandpiper
- Sanderling
- Willet
- Turnstone
- Curlew
- Pelican
- Sooty shearwater
- Gull
- Barn swallow
- Western snowy plover

== Plant life ==
- Beach primrose
- Beach aster
- Blue blossom
- Brass buttons
- Cheese weed
- Chickweed
- Coyote bush
- Daisy
- Gumplant
- Coast hedge-nettle
- Poison hemlock
- Douglas iris
- Miner's lettuce
- Live-forever
- Lizard tail
- Coast lotus
- Coastal bush lupin
- Varicolored lupine
- Mallow
- Wild mustard
- Yellow oxalis
- Indian paintbrush
- Beach pea
- California poppy
- Wild radish
- Sagewort
- Sea fig
- Yellow sand verbena
- Sea-rocket
- Spilt-milk thistle
- Lotus trefoil
- Vetch
- Wallflower
- Watercress

== Photo gallery ==
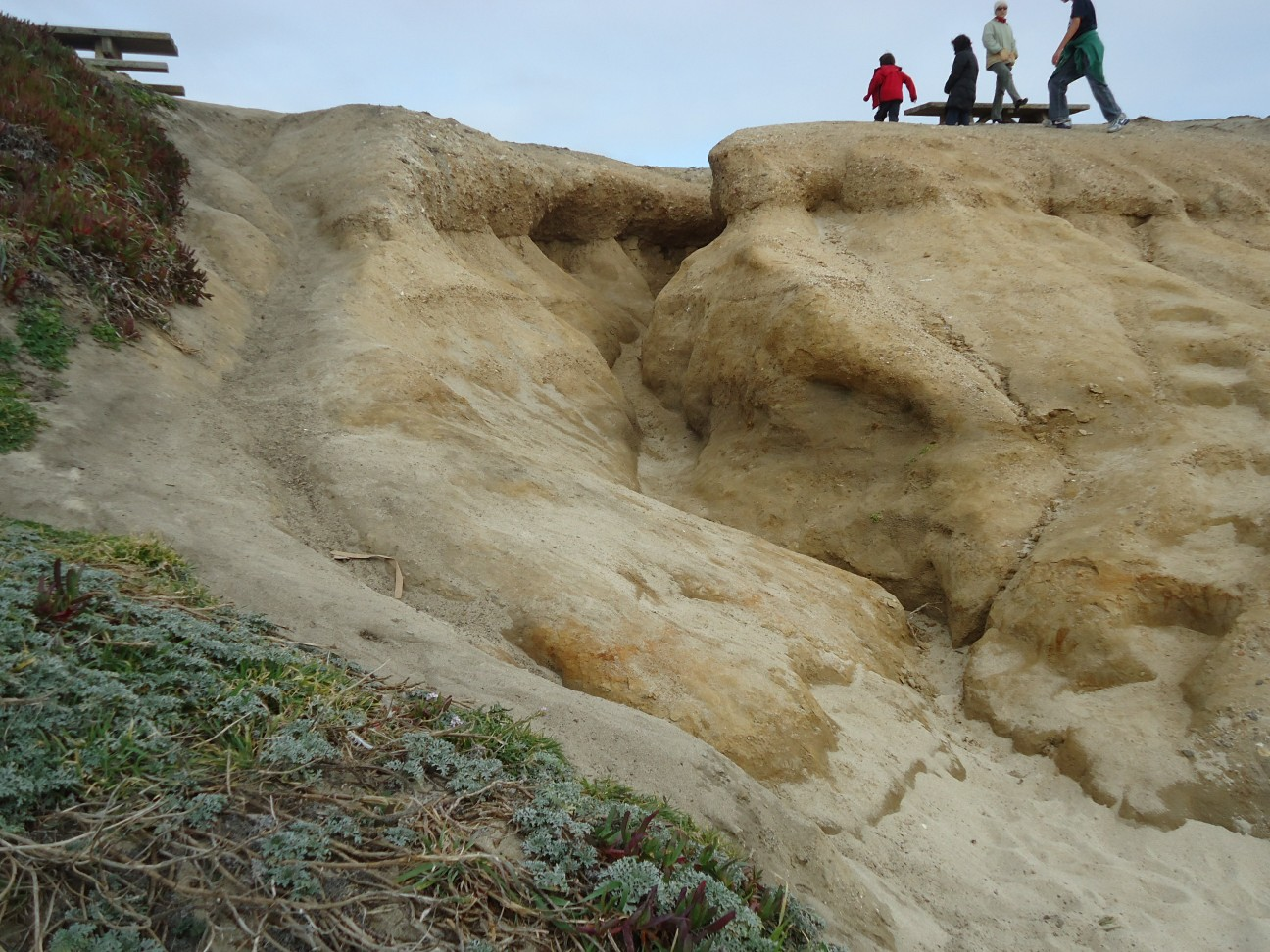
A stretch of rock eroded by wind, water, and sand

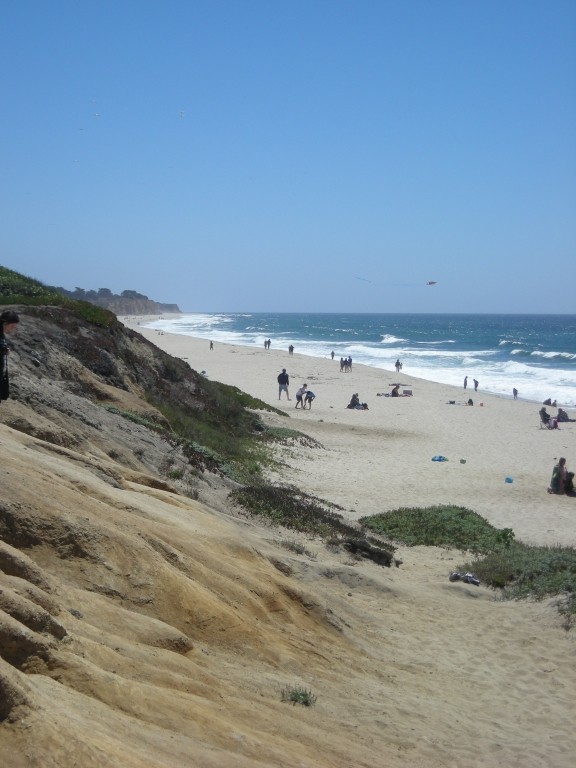
View south on Francis Beach

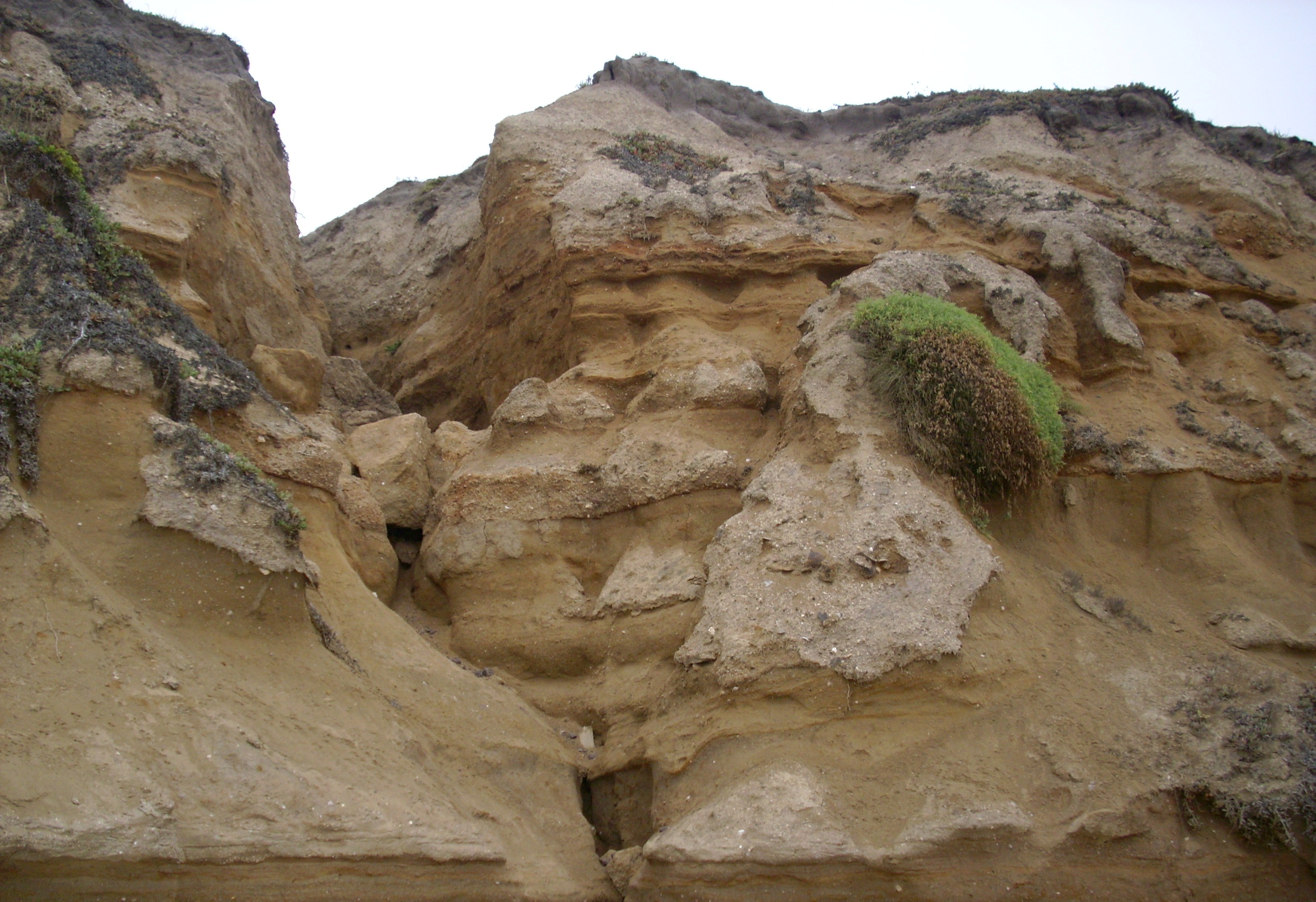
Cliffs of Half Moon Bay

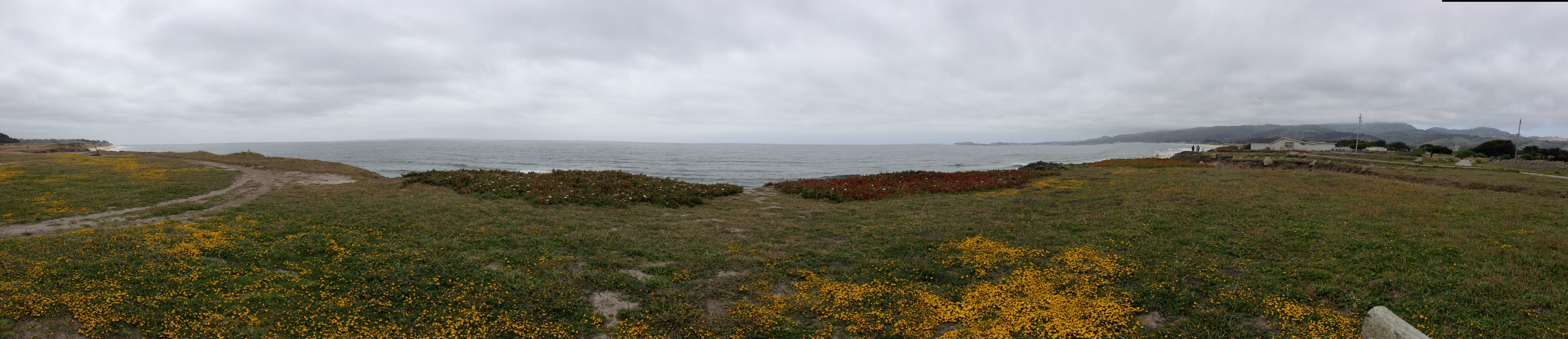
Panorama view from blufftop

== See also ==
- Poplar Beach, a municipal beach, immediately south of the State Beach, that is open to horses and leashed dogs
- List of beaches in California
- List of California state parks
