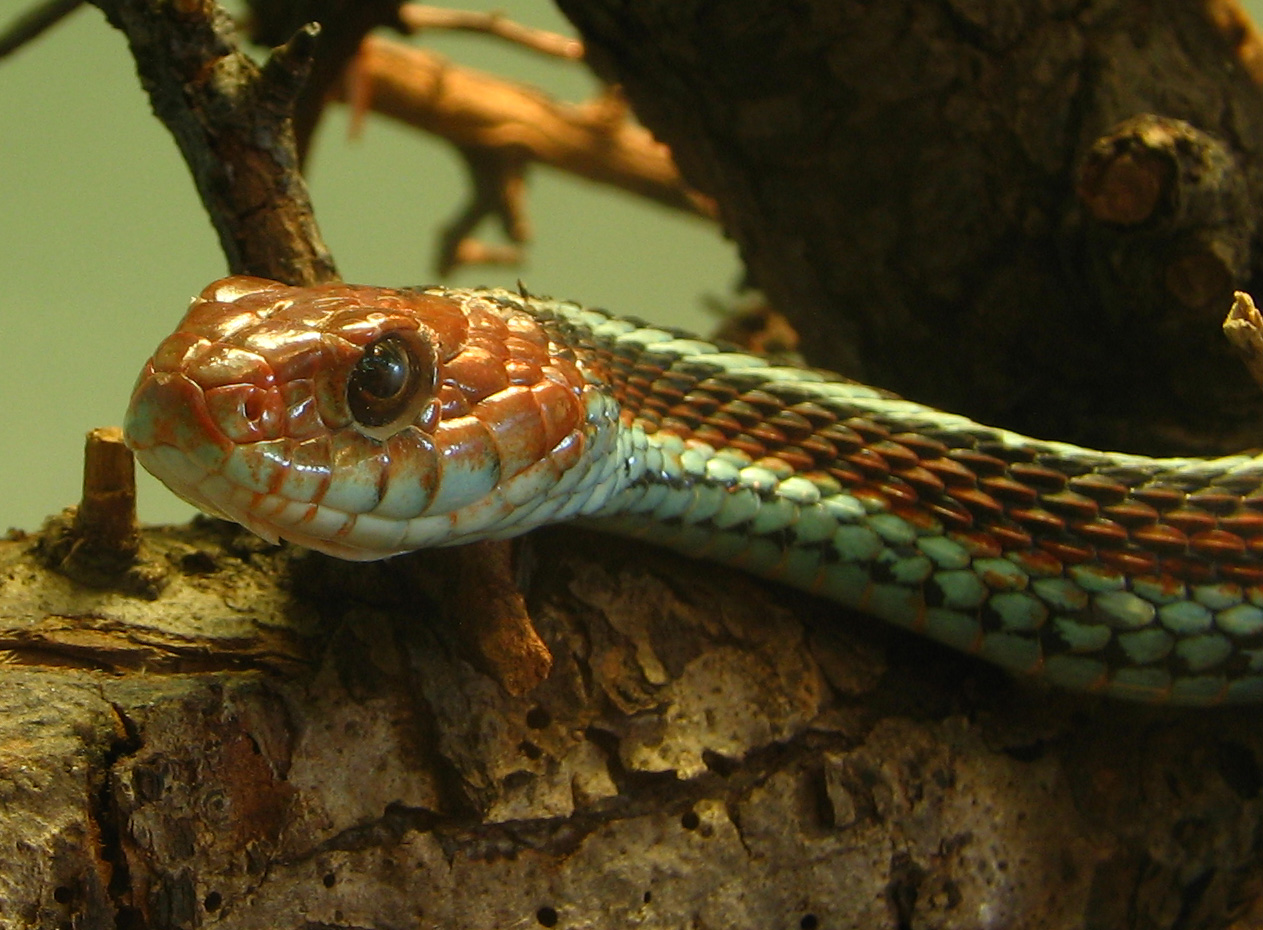

Conservation status
- Imperiled (NatureServe)

- Endangered (ESA)

Scientific classification
- Kingdom: Animalia
- Phylum: Chordata
- Class: Reptilia
- Order: Squamata
- Suborder: Serpentes
- Family: Colubridae
- Genus: Thamnophis
- Species: T. sirtalis
- Subspecies: T. s. tetrataenia

Trinomial name
- Thamnophis sirtalis tetrataenia (Cope, 1875)

Synonyms
- Eutaenia sirtalis tetratænia Cope, 1875

= San Francisco garter snake =

San Francisco Garter Snake

Subspecies of snake

The San Francisco garter snake (Thamnophis sirtalis tetrataenia) is a slender multi-colored subspecies of the common garter snake. Designated as an endangered subspecies since the year 1967, it is endemic to San Mateo County and the extreme northern part of coastal Santa Cruz County in California.

Some researchers estimate that there are only 1,000 to 2,000 adult snakes of the subspecies T. s. tetrataenia remaining. However, the full extent of the snakes' habitat has not been fully documented, and many snakes may utilize creeks and other waterways where the population of this species has not been studied. This garter snake prefers wet and marshy areas, and because of its elusive nature, it is difficult to see or capture.

== Geographic range ==
The San Francisco garter snake, a subspecies of the common garter snake, is found in scattered wetland areas on the San Francisco Peninsula from approximately the northern boundary of San Mateo County south along the eastern and western bases of the Santa Cruz Mountains, at least to the Upper Crystal Springs Reservoir, and along the Pacific coast south to Año Nuevo Point, and thence to Waddell Creek in Santa Cruz County. It is difficult to obtain reliable distribution information and population statistics for the San Francisco garter snake, because of the elusive nature of this reptile and the fact that much of the remaining suitable habitat is located on private property that has not been surveyed for the presence of the snake. This subspecies is extremely shy, difficult to locate and capture, and quick to flee to water or cover when disturbed. The U.S. Fish and Wildlife Service has stated that many locations that previously had healthy populations of garter snakes are now in decline due to land development pressure and the filling of wetlands in San Mateo County over the last sixty years. However, in many areas where it still occurs, it is not rare, but is actually quite common and can be viewed with good success once its behavior is understood.

== Description ==
Adult San Francisco garter snakes can grow to a total length of 18–55 inches (46–140 cm). Males are more commonly than not smaller than the females, growing to only 55% of female weight. They have keeled dorsal scales of blue-green, bordered by stripes of black, red (sometimes orange), and blue-green. Their head is barely wider than the neck, and is red. Its eyes are large compared to other species of garter snakes, giving the snake good eyesight to be primarily active during the day. Studies have shown that snout length is indicative of reproductive behaviors, as great snout length is correlated with ovarian follicle growth, which increases sexual activity of the female subspecies.

Garter snakes are practically harmless to humans. Their bites are fatal to their prey, but only cause a mild irritation for humans. With mildly toxic venom in their saliva, garter snakes possess no fangs.

== Habitat ==
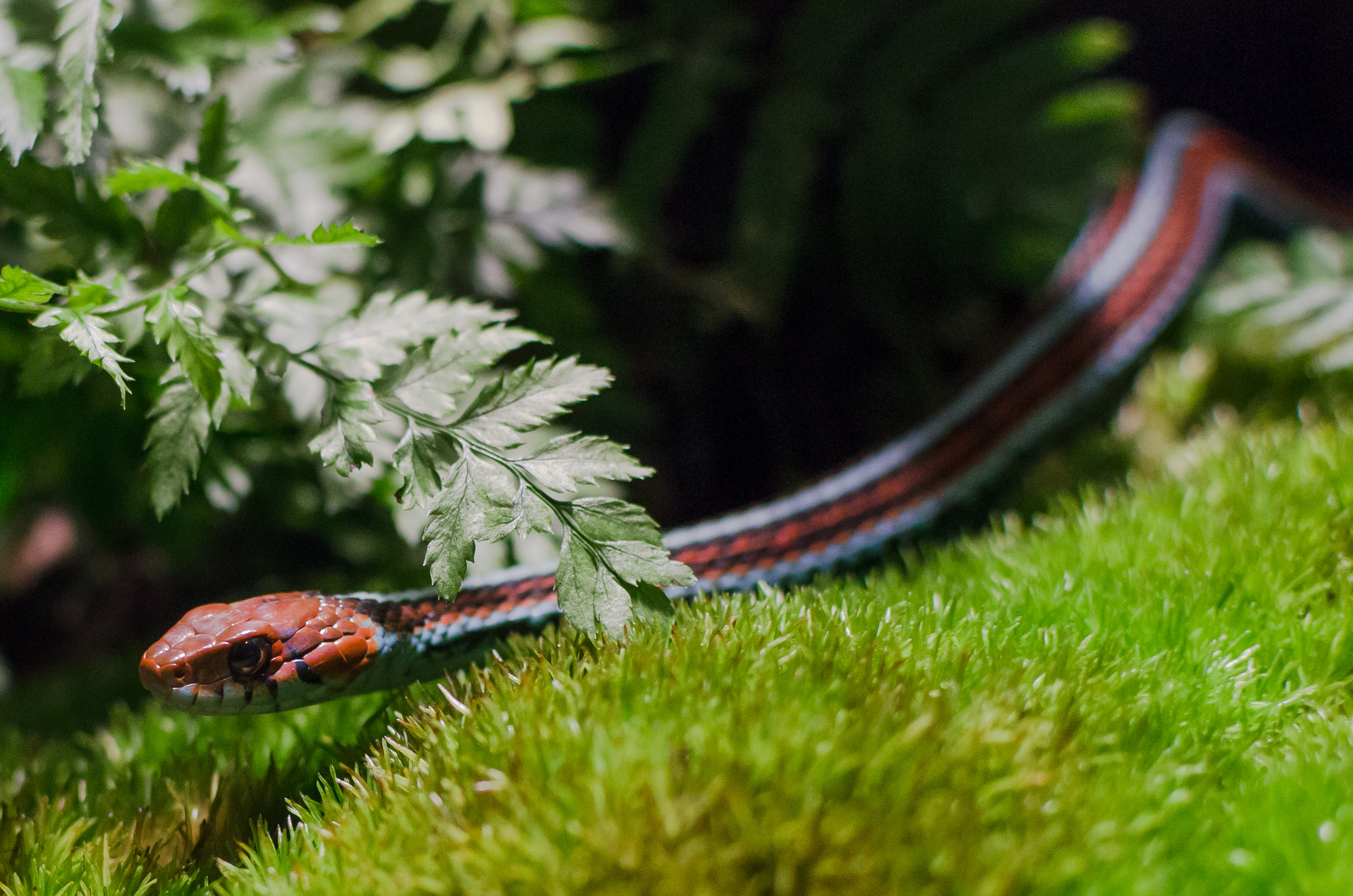
The San Francisco garter snake is often found in wet environments.

The preferred habitat of the San Francisco garter snake is a densely vegetated pond near an open hillside where it can sun, feed, and find cover in rodent burrows; however, markedly less suitable habitat can be successfully used. This subspecies can also be found in forests with dense canopies. Temporary ponds and other seasonal freshwater bodies are also appropriate. This subspecies avoids brackish marsh areas because its preferred prey, the California red-legged frog (Rana draytonii), cannot survive in saline water. Emergent and bankside vegetation such as cattails (Typha spp.), bulrushes (Scirpus / Schoenoplectus spp.), and spike rushes (Juncus spp. and Eleocharis spp.) apparently are preferred and used for cover. The zone between stream and pond habitats and grasslands or bank sides is characteristically utilized for basking, while nearby dense vegetation or water often provide escape cover. The subspecies occasionally uses floating algal or rush mats, when available. The biggest population is found in a protected tract owned by San Francisco International Airport.

== Diet ==
San Francisco garter snakes forage extensively in aquatic habitats. Adult snakes feed primarily on California red-legged frogs (Rana draytonii), which are federally listed as threatened. They may also feed on juvenile American bullfrogs (Rana catesbeiana), but they are unable to consume adults; in fact, adult bullfrogs prey on juvenile garter snakes, and may be a contributing factor in the population decline of the San Francisco garter snake. Newborn and juvenile San Francisco garter snakes depend heavily upon Pacific treefrogs (Pseudacris regilla) as prey. If newly metamorphosed Pacific treefrogs are not available, the young garter snakes may not survive. San Francisco garter snakes are one of the few animals capable of ingesting the toxic California newt (Taricha torosa) without incurring sickness or death. When no frogs or newts are available, the San Francisco garter snake feeds on small fish, toads, and rodents.

== Taxonomy and relation to other garter snakes ==
For a brief period from 1996 to 2000 there was confusion over the differentiation of the San Francisco garter snake from two other subspecies from California, the California red-sided garter snake (T. s. infernalis) and the red-spotted garter snake (T. s. concinnus). Barry petitioned the International Commission on Zoological Nomenclature (ICZN) to suppress the changes proposed in 1996 to merge two of these species. In 2000, the ICZN agreed and voted to retain the historical taxonomic arrangement of subspecies within this evolutionary lineage. Accordingly, the subspecies tetrataenia was reaffirmed for the San Francisco garter snake and the races concinnus and infernalis retain their historical definition.

The San Francisco garter snake cohabits ecosystems that also host a subspecies of two other garter snake species: the coastal garter snake (Thamnophis elegans terrestris), a subspecies of the western terrestrial garter snake (T. elegans), and the Santa Cruz garter snake (Thamnophis atratus atratus) a subspecies of the aquatic garter snake (T. atratus). These three subspecies are known to prey upon the same foods; however, their preferences are slightly different. Herpetologist Sean Barry notes that the three subspecies divide up the food resources as follows:

- the San Francisco garter snake eats primarily small frogs;
- the coastal garter snake eats principally slugs;
- the Santa Cruz garter snake eats preferentially minute fish and amphibian larvae.

== DNA analysis ==
While the findings of the ICZN have given the San Francisco garter snake unique taxonomic standing for now, a molecular study challenges the subspecific status of this population. Janzen analyzed sequences in mitochondrial DNA to determine relationships within the subspecies of the common garter snake (T. sirtalis). Janzen found that molecular evidence differed, often sharply, with the territorial boundaries of subspecies named on phenotypic variation. He further deduced that local environmental forces were more significant in shaping the color patterns shown by the common garter snake subspecies than shared common ancestry, and concluded all morphologically based subspecies in the western U.S. to be subject to revision. This result strongly suggests that the color traits that are diagnostic for T. s. tetrataenia are the result of local selection, rather than long-term isolation from the other subspecies of T. sirtalis in central California. On the other hand, the article places the three nearest populations of T. s. infernalis to T. s. tetrataenia in Sonoma County, Contra Costa County, and Santa Clara County into a separate group that exhibits an "elevated rate of molecular evolution". The authors suggest that sequencing nuclear DNA may provide a more precise analytical tool to crack some of the ultimate taxonomic quandaries of the San Francisco garter snake and its relatives.

== Outlook for this subspecies ==
Many of the factors that led to the listing of the San Francisco garter snake in 1967 continue to affect the subspecies. These environmental elements include loss of habitat from agricultural development, urban development, saltwater intrusion from the ocean, reduction in prey availability, as well as collection by reptile fanciers and breeders. Collection of these endangered animals by private citizens remains illegal.

Recent surveys suggest that there has been very little decrease in the overall range of the San Francisco garter snake compared to its historical distribution. However, there are now fewer populations and fewer snakes within that range, and some populations have disappeared. Many of the remaining populations have also become isolated because of urbanization.

== In popular culture ==
In 2023 the San Francisco garter snake was featured on a United States Postal Service Forever stamp as part of the Endangered Species set, based on a photograph from Joel Sartore's Photo Ark. The stamp was dedicated at a ceremony at the National Grasslands Visitor Center in Wall, South Dakota.
