= Cosmopterosis spatha =

Scientific classification
- Kingdom: Animalia
- Phylum: Arthropoda
- Clade: Pancrustacea
- Class: Insecta
- Order: Lepidoptera
- Family: Crambidae
- Genus: Cosmopterosis
- Species: C. spatha

Binomial name
- Cosmopterosis spatha Solis in Solis, Metz & Janzen, 2009

Species of moth

Cosmopterosis spatha is a moth in the family Crambidae. It was described by Maria Alma Solis in 2009. It is found in Costa Rica, where it has been recorded from the provinces of Alajuela, Guanacaste, Limon and Puntarenas. It is found at altitudes between 50 and 1,600 meters.

The larvae feed on Capparis mollicella and Forchhammeria trifoliata.
