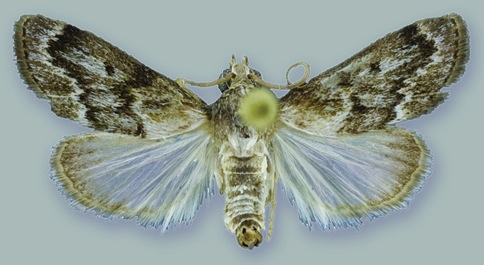

Scientific classification
- Kingdom: Animalia
- Phylum: Arthropoda
- Clade: Pancrustacea
- Class: Insecta
- Order: Lepidoptera
- Family: Crambidae
- Genus: Schacontia
- Species: S. nyx

Binomial name
- Schacontia nyx Solis & Goldstein, 2013

= Schacontia nyx =

Species of moth

Schacontia nyx is a moth of the family Crambidae described by Maria Alma Solis and Paul Z. Goldstein in 2013. It is found in northern Venezuela.

The length of the forewings is 6–7 mm. The antemedial and postmedial lines on the forewings are darkened at the medial area and white towards the basal and postmedial areas. The hindwings are white, but shaded greyish brown towards the margin. Adults have been recorded on wing from March to May.

== Etymology ==
The specific epithet refers to Nyx, the primordial goddess of the night in Greek mythology.
