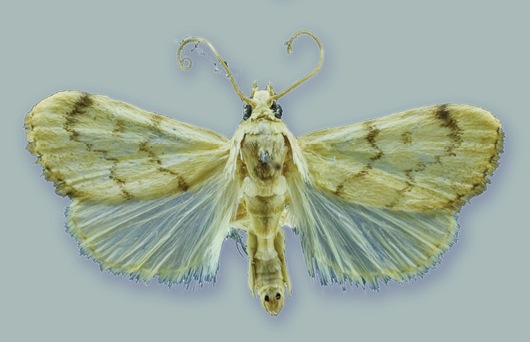
- Male

Scientific classification
- Kingdom: Animalia
- Phylum: Arthropoda
- Clade: Pancrustacea
- Class: Insecta
- Order: Lepidoptera
- Family: Crambidae
- Genus: Schacontia
- Species: S. lachesis

Binomial name
- Schacontia lachesis Solis & Goldstein, 2013

= Schacontia lachesis =

Species of moth

Schacontia lachesis is a moth of the family Crambidae described by Maria Alma Solis and Paul Z. Goldstein in 2013. It is found in central Brazil (Rondonia east to Bahia, Ceara and Rio de Janeiro) and Bolivia (Santa Cruz).

The length of the forewings is 5–7.5 mm. The prothoracic scaling on the forewings is tan grey, straw or yellowish. The medial area is polymorphic ranging from light to dark brown in both sexes, dusted with white. Adults have been recorded on wing in January, April, November and December in Brazil and from October to December in Bolivia.

== Etymology ==
The specific epithet refers to Lachesis, the middle sister of the three Fates in Greek mythology. She was thought to be the personification of destiny responsible for measuring the duration of human life.
