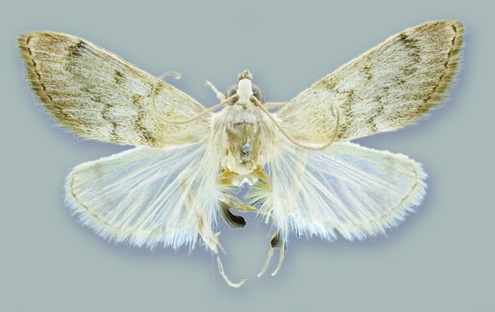
- Male holotype

Scientific classification
- Kingdom: Animalia
- Phylum: Arthropoda
- Clade: Pancrustacea
- Class: Insecta
- Order: Lepidoptera
- Family: Crambidae
- Genus: Schacontia
- Species: S. clotho

Binomial name
- Schacontia clotho Solis & Goldstein, 2013

= Schacontia clotho =

Species of moth

Schacontia clotho is a moth of the family Crambidae described by Maria Alma Solis and Paul Z. Goldstein in 2013. It is found in southern Ecuador.

The length of the forewings is 6.9–7 mm. The forewings are more or less uniform mouse grey, with very light dusting of very pale grey in medial and postmedial areas. The hindwings are nearly translucent. Adults have been recorded on wing in December.

== Etymology ==
The specific epithet refers to Clotho, the youngest of the three Fates in Greek mythology. She was said to be responsible for spinning the thread of human life.
