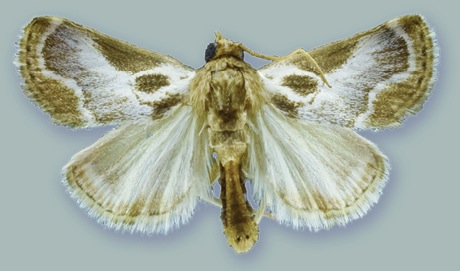
- Male holotype

Scientific classification
- Kingdom: Animalia
- Phylum: Arthropoda
- Clade: Pancrustacea
- Class: Insecta
- Order: Lepidoptera
- Family: Crambidae
- Genus: Schacontia
- Species: S. speciosa

Binomial name
- Schacontia speciosa Solis & Goldstein, 2013

= Schacontia speciosa =

Species of moth

Schacontia speciosa is a moth of the family Crambidae described by Maria Alma Solis and Paul Z. Goldstein in 2013. It is found in south-eastern Brazil.

The length of the forewings is 7.5–8 mm. The medial area of the forewings is grey, partially suffused with white. The postmedial line is shaded with white outwardly and brown inwardly. The basal and submarginal areas are primarily mocha brown. The hindwings are brownish white, with no contrasting markings. Adults have been recorded on wing in October.

== Etymology ==
The specific epithet is from the Latin for showy or handsome.
