= Cosmopterosis hispida =

Scientific classification
- Kingdom: Animalia
- Phylum: Arthropoda
- Clade: Pancrustacea
- Class: Insecta
- Order: Lepidoptera
- Family: Crambidae
- Genus: Cosmopterosis
- Species: C. hispida

Binomial name
- Cosmopterosis hispida Solis in Solis, Metz & Janzen, 2009

Species of moth

Cosmopterosis hispida is a moth in the family Crambidae. It was described by Maria Alma Solis in 2009. It is found in Brazil (Rio de Janeiro).
