= Lipocosma rosalia =

Scientific classification
- Kingdom: Animalia
- Phylum: Arthropoda
- Clade: Pancrustacea
- Class: Insecta
- Order: Lepidoptera
- Family: Crambidae
- Genus: Lipocosma
- Species: L. rosalia

Binomial name
- Lipocosma rosalia Solis & Adamski, 1998

Species of moth

Lipocosma rosalia is a moth in the family Crambidae. It was described by Maria Alma Solis and David Adamski in 1998. It is found from Mexico south to northern South America.

The length of the forewings is 4.8-6.5 mm.

== Etymology ==
The species name refers to Santa Rosa National Park, the type locality.
