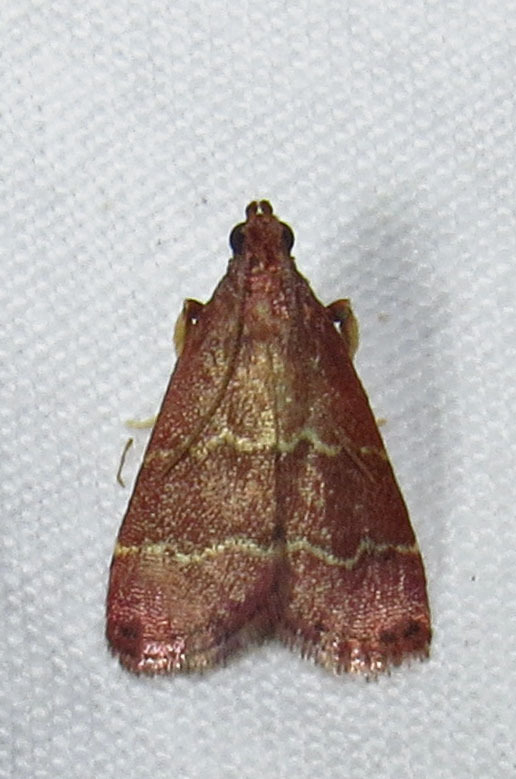

Scientific classification
- Domain: Eukaryota
- Kingdom: Animalia
- Phylum: Arthropoda
- Class: Insecta
- Order: Lepidoptera
- Family: Pyralidae
- Genus: Heliades
- Species: H. mulleolella

Binomial name
- Heliades mulleolella (Hulst, 1887)

Synonyms
- Pempelia mulleolella Hulst, 1887; Xantippe uranides Dyar, 1921

= Heliades mulleolella =

Species of moth

Heliades mulleolella is a species of moth of the family Pyralidae. It is found in the south-eastern United States (Florida and Alabama). Records from Arizona refer to Heliades huachucalis.

The wingspan is about 15 mm.
