= Lipocosma fonsecai =

Scientific classification
- Kingdom: Animalia
- Phylum: Arthropoda
- Clade: Pancrustacea
- Class: Insecta
- Order: Lepidoptera
- Family: Crambidae
- Genus: Lipocosma
- Species: L. fonsecai

Binomial name
- Lipocosma fonsecai Solis & Adamski, 1998

Species of moth

Lipocosma fonsecai is a moth in the family Crambidae. It was described by Maria Alma Solis and David Adamski in 1998. It is found in Costa Rica.

The length of the forewings is 6.4-6.7 mm.
