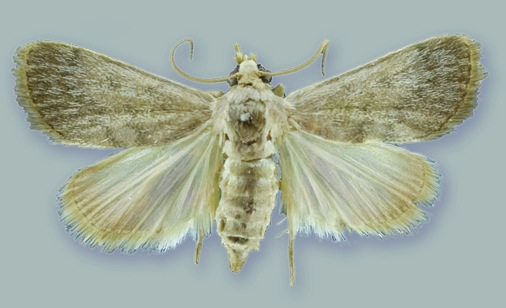
- Male holotype

Scientific classification
- Kingdom: Animalia
- Phylum: Arthropoda
- Clade: Pancrustacea
- Class: Insecta
- Order: Lepidoptera
- Family: Crambidae
- Genus: Schacontia
- Species: S. rasa

Binomial name
- Schacontia rasa Solis & Goldstein, 2013

= Schacontia rasa =

Species of moth

Schacontia rasa is a moth of the family Crambidae described by Maria Alma Solis and Paul Z. Goldstein in 2013. It is found in Mexico, Cuba and the Dominican Republic.

The length of the forewings is 7–8 mm. The medial area of the forewings is grey and single coloured with the basal area and postmedial areas. The antemedial and postmedial lines are jagged and darker grey. The postmedial line on the hindwings is faint. The hindwings are outwardly tinged with bronze. Adults have been recorded on wing in June (in Mexico), July (in Cuba) and July and September (the Dominican Republic).

== Etymology ==
The specific epithet refers to the absence of male hind tibial and metatarsal structures and epipleural setal tufts (presumably secondary sexual characters) present in other Schacontia species.
