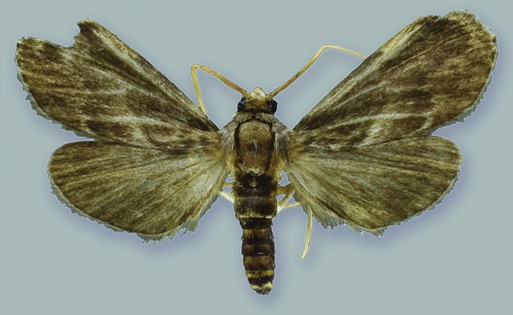
- Male paratype

Scientific classification
- Kingdom: Animalia
- Phylum: Arthropoda
- Clade: Pancrustacea
- Class: Insecta
- Order: Lepidoptera
- Family: Crambidae
- Genus: Schacontia
- Species: S. umbra

Binomial name
- Schacontia umbra Solis & Goldstein, 2013

= Schacontia umbra =

Species of moth

Schacontia umbra is a moth of the family Crambidae described by Maria Alma Solis and Paul Z. Goldstein in 2013. It is found in central Ecuador.

The length of the forewings is 7.5–8 mm. The forewings are shaded grey brown and the hindwings are dark grey brown.

== Etymology ==
The specific epithet refers to the dark wing shading of this species.
