= Glaphyria spinacrista =

Scientific classification
- Kingdom: Animalia
- Phylum: Arthropoda
- Clade: Pancrustacea
- Class: Insecta
- Order: Lepidoptera
- Family: Crambidae
- Genus: Glaphyria
- Species: G. spinacrista

Binomial name
- Glaphyria spinacrista Solis & Adamski, 1998

Species of moth

Glaphyria spinacrista is a moth in the family Crambidae. It was described by Maria Alma Solis and David Adamski in 1998. It is found in north-western Costa Rica.
