= Cosmopterosis jasonhalli =

Scientific classification
- Kingdom: Animalia
- Phylum: Arthropoda
- Clade: Pancrustacea
- Class: Insecta
- Order: Lepidoptera
- Family: Crambidae
- Genus: Cosmopterosis
- Species: C. jasonhalli

Binomial name
- Cosmopterosis jasonhalli Solis in Solis, Metz & Janzen, 2009

Species of moth

Cosmopterosis jasonhalli is a moth in the family Crambidae. It was described by Maria Alma Solis in 2009. It is found from Sinaloa, Mexico, south to Paraguay, Peru and Venezuela. It is also found Trinidad and Tobago. It is found at elevations between 50 and 900 meters. Adults are on wing year round. The larvae feed on Capparis frondosa and Capparis flexuosa.

== Etymology ==
The species is named for Dr. Jason P. W. Hall, the spouse of the first author.
