= Lascelina papillina =

Scientific classification
- Kingdom: Animalia
- Phylum: Arthropoda
- Clade: Pancrustacea
- Class: Insecta
- Order: Lepidoptera
- Family: Pyralidae
- Subfamily: Phycitinae
- Genus: Lascelina
- Species: L. papillina

Binomial name
- Lascelina papillina Neunzig & Solis, 2002

Species of moth

Lascelina papillina is a species of snout moth in the family Pyralidae. It was described by Herbert H. Neunzig and Maria Alma Solis in 2002 and is known from Costa Rica.

The species belongs to the genus Lascelina, which was established by Carl Heinrich in 1956 and includes several Neotropical species of snout moths.

The type locality for L. papillina is Rancho Quemado on the Osa Peninsula in Costa Rica, where specimens were collected in lowland tropical forest habitats.
