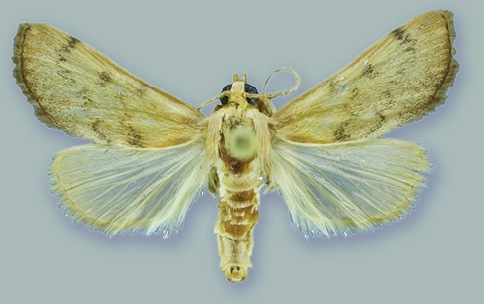

Scientific classification
- Kingdom: Animalia
- Phylum: Arthropoda
- Clade: Pancrustacea
- Class: Insecta
- Order: Lepidoptera
- Family: Crambidae
- Genus: Schacontia
- Species: S. themis

Binomial name
- Schacontia themis Solis & Goldstein, 2013

= Schacontia themis =

Species of moth

Schacontia themis is a moth of the family Crambidae described by Maria Alma Solis and Paul Z. Goldstein in 2013. It is found on the Cayman Islands and in Brazil, Costa Rica, Cuba, the Dominican Republic, Florida, Jamaica, Mexico, Panama, Puerto Rico and Venezuela.

The length of the forewings is 5.3–10 mm. The ground colour of the forewings is straw, with few contrasting markings other than jagged chocolate-brown antemedial and postmedial lines. The hindwings are almost uniformly pale, shaded brown at the subterminal area. Adults have been recorded on wing from January to April and in August in Costa Rica, from March to April in Panama, from April to May in Jamaica and the Cayman Islands, in July in the Dominican Republic, from June to July in Cuba, in June and August in Puerto Rico, from April to May in Venezuela and from July to August in Brazil.

The larvae possibly feed on Capparaceae species.

== Etymology ==
The specific epithet refers to Themis, the Greek Titaness and embodiment of divine order.
