= Lipocosma pitilla =

Scientific classification
- Kingdom: Animalia
- Phylum: Arthropoda
- Clade: Pancrustacea
- Class: Insecta
- Order: Lepidoptera
- Family: Crambidae
- Genus: Lipocosma
- Species: L. pitilla

Binomial name
- Lipocosma pitilla Solis & Adamski, 1998

Species of moth

Lipocosma pitilla is a moth in the family Crambidae. It was described by Maria Alma Solis and David Adamski in 1998. It is found in Costa Rica.

The length of the forewings is 6.8-7.4 mm.

== Etymology ==
The species name refers to Estacion Pitilla, the type locality.
