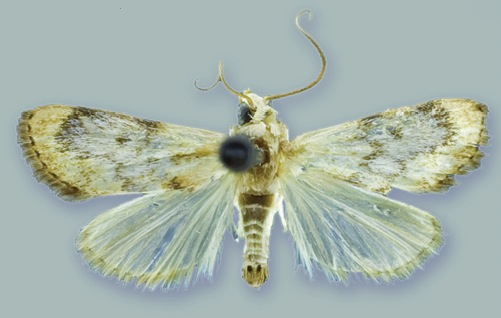
- Male holotype

Scientific classification
- Kingdom: Animalia
- Phylum: Arthropoda
- Clade: Pancrustacea
- Class: Insecta
- Order: Lepidoptera
- Family: Crambidae
- Genus: Schacontia
- Species: S. atropos

Binomial name
- Schacontia atropos Solis & Goldstein, 2013

= Schacontia atropos =

Species of moth

Schacontia atropos is a moth of the family Crambidae described by Maria Alma Solis and Paul Z. Goldstein. It is found in northern Venezuela.

The length of the forewings is 5.4–5.5 mm. The ground colour of the forewings is straw yellow, with a brown-grey medial area, heavily suffused with white scales. The hindwings are pale, nearly translucent.

== Etymology ==
The specific epithet refers to Atropos, the third of the three Fates.
