= Ceracanthia eugenieae =

Scientific classification
- Kingdom: Animalia
- Phylum: Arthropoda
- Class: Insecta
- Order: Lepidoptera
- Family: Pyralidae
- Genus: Ceracanthia
- Species: C. eugenieae

Binomial name
- Ceracanthia eugenieae Neunzig & Solis, 2002

Species of moth

Ceracanthia eugenieae is a species of snout moth. It was described by Herbert H. Neunzig and Maria Alma Solis in 2002 and is known from Costa Rica.
