= Neurophyseta sittenfelda =

Scientific classification
- Kingdom: Animalia
- Phylum: Arthropoda
- Clade: Pancrustacea
- Class: Insecta
- Order: Lepidoptera
- Family: Crambidae
- Genus: Neurophyseta
- Species: N. sittenfelda

Binomial name
- Neurophyseta sittenfelda Phillips & Solis, 1996

Species of insect

Neurophyseta sittenfelda is a species of moth in the family Crambidae. It was described by Eugenie Phillips-Rodriguez and Maria Alma Solis in 1996. It is found in Costa Rica.

== Etymology ==
The species is named in honor of Ana Sittenfeld.
