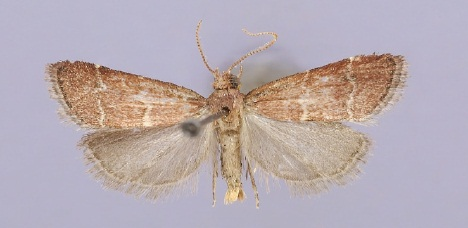

Scientific classification
- Domain: Eukaryota
- Kingdom: Animalia
- Phylum: Arthropoda
- Class: Insecta
- Order: Lepidoptera
- Family: Pyralidae
- Genus: Heliades
- Species: H. lindae

Binomial name
- Heliades lindae Cashatt in Solis, Cashatt & Cashatt & Scholtens, 2012

= Heliades lindae =

Species of moth

Heliades lindae is a species of moth of the family Pyralidae that is endemic to Arizona.

The wingspan is 15–17 millimetres (0.59–0.67 in). The forewings are brownish red with white dentate antemedial and postmedial lines. The hindwings are light greyish brown.
