= Lascelina cordobensis =

Scientific classification
- Domain: Eukaryota
- Kingdom: Animalia
- Phylum: Arthropoda
- Class: Insecta
- Order: Lepidoptera
- Family: Pyralidae
- Genus: Lascelina
- Species: L. cordobensis

Binomial name
- Lascelina cordobensis (Neunzig, 1994)

Synonyms
- Megacerdresa cordobensis Neunzig, 1994

Species of moth

Lascelina cordobensis is a species of snout moth in the genus Lascelina. It was described by Herbert H. Neunzig in 1994 from Córdoba, Mexico, from which its species epithet is derived.
