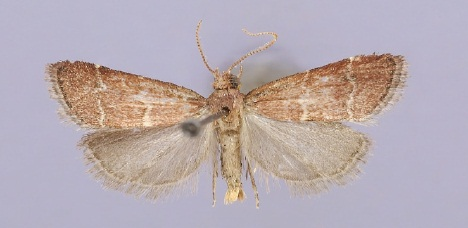

Scientific classification
- Domain: Eukaryota
- Kingdom: Animalia
- Phylum: Arthropoda
- Class: Insecta
- Order: Lepidoptera
- Family: Pyralidae
- Subfamily: Chrysauginae
- Genus: Heliades; Ragonot, 1891

= Heliades (moth) =

Genus of moths

Heliades is a genus of moths of the family Pyralidae.

== Species ==
- Heliades huachucalis Haimbach, 1915
- Heliades lindae Cashatt in Solis, Cashatt & Scholtens, 2012
- Heliades mulleolella (Hulst, 1887)
