= Neurophyseta perlalis =

Scientific classification
- Kingdom: Animalia
- Phylum: Arthropoda
- Class: Insecta
- Order: Lepidoptera
- Family: Crambidae
- Genus: Neurophyseta
- Species: N. perlalis

Binomial name
- Neurophyseta perlalis (Hampson, 1897)

Synonyms
- Nymphula perlalis Hampson, 1897

Species of moth

Neurophyseta perlalis is a moth in the family Crambidae. It was described by George Hampson in 1897. It is found in Peru.
