= Lipocosma isola =

Scientific classification
- Domain: Eukaryota
- Kingdom: Animalia
- Phylum: Arthropoda
- Class: Insecta
- Order: Lepidoptera
- Family: Crambidae
- Genus: Lipocosma
- Species: L. isola

Binomial name
- Lipocosma isola Munroe, 1965

Species of moth

Lipocosma isola is a moth in the family Crambidae.

It is native to the Islas Marías, in the Pacific off Nayarit in west-central Mexico.
