= Neurophyseta interruptalis =

Scientific classification
- Domain: Eukaryota
- Kingdom: Animalia
- Phylum: Arthropoda
- Class: Insecta
- Order: Lepidoptera
- Family: Crambidae
- Genus: Neurophyseta
- Species: N. interruptalis

Binomial name
- Neurophyseta interruptalis (Wileman & South, 1917)

Synonyms
- Ambia interruptalis Wileman & South, 1917; Cymoriza interruptalis

Species of moth

Neurophyseta interruptalis is a moth in the family Crambidae. It was described by Wileman and South in 1917. It is found in Taiwan.
