= Neurophyseta saniralis =

Scientific classification
- Kingdom: Animalia
- Phylum: Arthropoda
- Class: Insecta
- Order: Lepidoptera
- Family: Crambidae
- Genus: Neurophyseta
- Species: N. saniralis

Binomial name
- Neurophyseta saniralis (Viette, 1989)

Synonyms
- Cymoriza saniralis Viette, 1989

Species of moth

Neurophyseta saniralis is a moth in the family Crambidae. It was described by Viette in 1989. It is found in Madagascar.
