= Neurophyseta cyclicalis =

Scientific classification
- Domain: Eukaryota
- Kingdom: Animalia
- Phylum: Arthropoda
- Class: Insecta
- Order: Lepidoptera
- Family: Crambidae
- Genus: Neurophyseta
- Species: N. cyclicalis

Binomial name
- Neurophyseta cyclicalis Schaus, 1913

Species of moth

Neurophyseta cyclicalis is a moth in the family Crambidae. It was described by William Schaus in 1913. It is found in Costa Rica.
