= Neurophyseta ursmaralis =

Scientific classification
- Domain: Eukaryota
- Kingdom: Animalia
- Phylum: Arthropoda
- Class: Insecta
- Order: Lepidoptera
- Family: Crambidae
- Genus: Neurophyseta
- Species: N. ursmaralis

Binomial name
- Neurophyseta ursmaralis Schaus, 1927

Species of moth

Neurophyseta ursmaralis is a moth in the family Crambidae. It was described by William Schaus in 1927. It is found in Argentina and Paraguay.
