= Neurophyseta graphicalis =

Scientific classification
- Kingdom: Animalia
- Phylum: Arthropoda
- Class: Insecta
- Order: Lepidoptera
- Family: Crambidae
- Genus: Neurophyseta
- Species: N. graphicalis

Binomial name
- Neurophyseta graphicalis (Hampson, 1917)

Synonyms
- Nymphula graphicalis Hampson, 1917

Species of moth

Neurophyseta graphicalis is a moth in the family Crambidae. It was described by George Hampson in 1917. It is found in Peru.
