= Glaphyria semiferrealis =

Scientific classification
- Kingdom: Animalia
- Phylum: Arthropoda
- Class: Insecta
- Order: Lepidoptera
- Family: Crambidae
- Genus: Glaphyria
- Species: G. semiferrealis

Binomial name
- Glaphyria semiferrealis (Hampson, 1898)

Synonyms
- Scybalista semiferrealis Hampson, 1898

Species of moth

Glaphyria semiferrealis is a moth in the family Crambidae. It is found in Brazil.
