= Glaphyria xanthoperalis =

Scientific classification
- Kingdom: Animalia
- Phylum: Arthropoda
- Class: Insecta
- Order: Lepidoptera
- Family: Crambidae
- Genus: Glaphyria
- Species: G. xanthoperalis

Binomial name
- Glaphyria xanthoperalis (Hampson, 1918)

Synonyms
- Thliptoceras xanthoperalis Hampson, 1918

Species of moth

Glaphyria xanthoperalis is a moth in the family Crambidae. It is found in Suriname.
