= Lascelina canens =

Scientific classification
- Domain: Eukaryota
- Kingdom: Animalia
- Phylum: Arthropoda
- Class: Insecta
- Order: Lepidoptera
- Family: Pyralidae
- Genus: Lascelina
- Species: L. canens

Binomial name
- Lascelina canens Heinrich, 1956

Species of moth

Lascelina canens is a species of snout moth in the genus Lascelina. It was described by Carl Heinrich in 1956. It is found in the US state of Texas.
