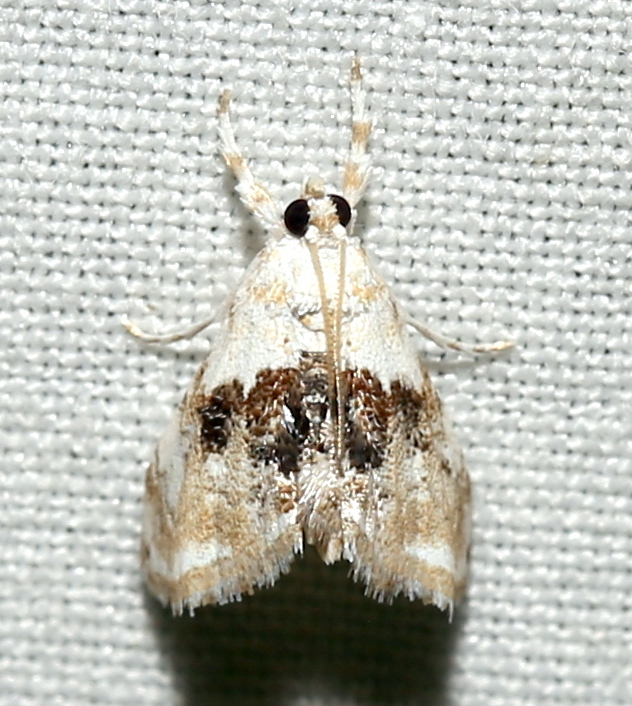

Scientific classification
- Kingdom: Animalia
- Phylum: Arthropoda
- Class: Insecta
- Order: Lepidoptera
- Family: Crambidae
- Genus: Lipocosma
- Species: L. septa

Binomial name
- Lipocosma septa Munroe, 1972

= Lipocosma septa =

Species of moth

Lipocosma septa, the exposed lipocosma moth, is a moth in the family Crambidae. It was described by Eugene G. Munroe in 1972. It is found in North America, where it has been recorded from Florida, Georgia, Maryland, North Carolina, Oklahoma, South Carolina, Texas and Virginia.
