= Neurophyseta sogalalis =

Scientific classification
- Kingdom: Animalia
- Phylum: Arthropoda
- Clade: Pancrustacea
- Class: Insecta
- Order: Lepidoptera
- Family: Crambidae
- Genus: Neurophyseta
- Species: N. sogalalis

Binomial name
- Neurophyseta sogalalis (Viette, 1989)

Synonyms
- Cymoriza sogalalis Viette, 1989

Species of moth

Neurophyseta sogalalis is a moth in the family Crambidae. It was described by Viette in 1989. It is found in Madagascar.
