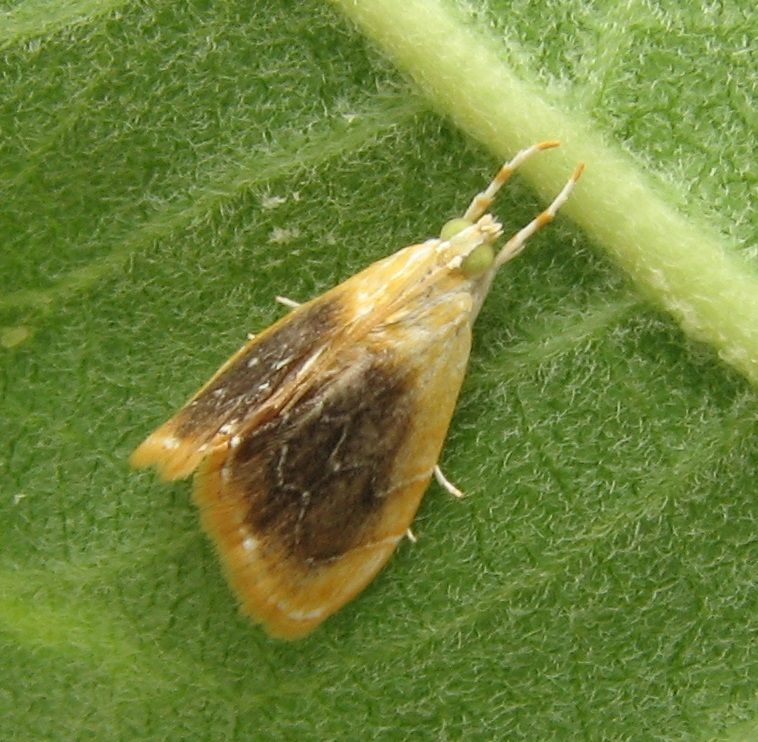
- Glaphyria fulminalis

Scientific classification
- Kingdom: Animalia
- Phylum: Arthropoda
- Class: Insecta
- Order: Lepidoptera
- Family: Crambidae
- Subfamily: Glaphyriinae
- Genus: Glaphyria; Hübner, 1823

Synonyms
- Berdura Möschler, 1886; Glaphria Fernald, 1903; Homophysa Guenée, 1854

= Glaphyria =

Genus of moths

Glaphyria is a genus of moths of the family Crambidae.

== Species ==
- Glaphyria acutalis
- Glaphyria albifascialis (Hampson, 1912)
- Glaphyria amazonica
- Glaphyria argentipunctalis (Amsel, 1956)
- Glaphyria badierana (Fabricius, 1794)
- Glaphyria basiflavalis
- Glaphyria cappsi
- Glaphyria citronalis (Druce, 1899)
- Glaphyria cymalis
- Glaphyria decisa (Walker, 1866)
- Glaphyria distictalis (Hampson, 1912)
- Glaphyria dolatalis
- Glaphyria flavidalis (Hampson, 1912)
- Glaphyria fulminalis (Grote, 1878)
- Glaphyria glaphyralis Guenée, 1854
- Glaphyria himerta
- Glaphyria leucostactalis (Hampson, 1912)
- Glaphyria matanzalis (Schaus, 1920)
- Glaphyria micralis
- Glaphyria moribundalis
- Glaphyria ochrofusalis (Amsel, 1956)
- Glaphyria oriola (Dyar, 1914)
- Glaphyria peremptalis
- Glaphyria polycyma
- Glaphyria potentalis
- Glaphyria pupillalis (Möschler, 1886)
- Glaphyria rufescens (Hampson, 1912)
- Glaphyria semiferrealis
- Glaphyria sesquistrialis Hübner, 1823
- Glaphyria spinacrista Solis & Adamski, 1998
- Glaphyria spinasingularis Solis & Adamski, 1998
- Glaphyria stellaspina Solis & Adamski, 1998
- Glaphyria tanamoalis (Schaus, 1920)
- Glaphyria tetraspina Solis & Adamski, 1998
- Glaphyria tripunctalis (Amsel, 1956)
- Glaphyria xanthoperalis
