= Glaphyria oriola =

Scientific classification
- Domain: Eukaryota
- Kingdom: Animalia
- Phylum: Arthropoda
- Class: Insecta
- Order: Lepidoptera
- Family: Crambidae
- Genus: Glaphyria
- Species: G. oriola

Binomial name
- Glaphyria oriola (Dyar, 1914)

Synonyms
- Homophysa oriola Dyar, 1914

Species of moth

Glaphyria oriola is a moth in the family Crambidae. It was described by Harrison Gray Dyar Jr. in 1914. It is found in Panama.
