= Neurophyseta aetalis =

Scientific classification
- Kingdom: Animalia
- Phylum: Arthropoda
- Class: Insecta
- Order: Lepidoptera
- Family: Crambidae
- Genus: Neurophyseta
- Species: N. aetalis

Binomial name
- Neurophyseta aetalis Walker, 1859

Synonyms
- Nymphula lotialis C. Felder, R. Felder & Rogenhofer, 1875

Species of moth

Neurophyseta aetalis is a moth in the family Crambidae. It was described by Francis Walker in 1859. It is found in Brazil.
