= Neurophyseta avertinalis =

Scientific classification
- Kingdom: Animalia
- Phylum: Arthropoda
- Class: Insecta
- Order: Lepidoptera
- Family: Crambidae
- Genus: Neurophyseta
- Species: N. avertinalis

Binomial name
- Neurophyseta avertinalis (Schaus, 1924)

Synonyms
- Nymphula avertinalis Schaus, 1924

Species of moth

Neurophyseta avertinalis is a moth in the family Crambidae described by William Schaus in 1924. It is found in Cuba.

The wingspan is about 13 mm. There a medial white line on the forewings, edged on either side with cinnamon brown. There is also a fine postmedial fuscous line, as well as small faint smoky marginal spots on the interspaces. The basal half of the hindwings is white.
