= Cosmopterosis =

Scientific classification
- Domain: Eukaryota
- Kingdom: Animalia
- Phylum: Arthropoda
- Class: Insecta
- Order: Lepidoptera
- Family: Crambidae
- Subfamily: Glaphyriinae
- Genus: Cosmopterosis; Amsel, 1956

Genus of moths

Cosmopterosis is a genus of moths of the family Crambidae.

== Species ==
- Cosmopterosis hispida Solis in Solis, Metz & Janzen, 2009
- Cosmopterosis jasonhalli Solis in Solis, Metz & Janzen, 2009
- Cosmopterosis spatha Solis in Solis, Metz & Janzen, 2009
- Cosmopterosis thetysalis (Walker, 1859)
