= Lascelina =

Scientific classification
- Domain: Eukaryota
- Kingdom: Animalia
- Phylum: Arthropoda
- Class: Insecta
- Order: Lepidoptera
- Family: Pyralidae
- Subfamily: Phycitinae
- Genus: Lascelina; Heinrich, 1956

Synonyms
- Megacerdresa Neunzig, 2002

Genus of moths

Lascelina is a genus of snout moths described by Carl Heinrich in 1956.

== Species ==
- Lascelina canens Heinrich, 1956
- Lascelina cordobensis (Neunzig, 2002)
- Lascelina papillina Neunzig & Solis, 2002
- Lascelina pitilla Neunzig & Solis, 2002
