= Lipocosma ausonialis =

Scientific classification
- Domain: Eukaryota
- Kingdom: Animalia
- Phylum: Arthropoda
- Class: Insecta
- Order: Lepidoptera
- Family: Crambidae
- Genus: Lipocosma
- Species: L. ausonialis

Binomial name
- Lipocosma ausonialis (H. Druce, 1899)

Synonyms
- Glaphyria ausonialis H. Druce, 1899; Lipocosmia plagalis Schaus, 1912

Species of moth

Lipocosma ausonialis is a moth in the family Crambidae. It was described by Herbert Druce in 1899. It is found from Guatemala to central Costa Rica.
