= Glaphyria moribundalis =

Scientific classification
- Kingdom: Animalia
- Phylum: Arthropoda
- Class: Insecta
- Order: Lepidoptera
- Family: Crambidae
- Genus: Glaphyria
- Species: G. moribundalis

Binomial name
- Glaphyria moribundalis (Dyar, 1914)

Synonyms
- Homophysa moribundalis Dyar, 1914

Species of moth

Glaphyria moribundalis is a moth in the family Crambidae. It is found in Panama.
