= Ceracanthia =

Scientific classification
- Domain: Eukaryota
- Kingdom: Animalia
- Phylum: Arthropoda
- Class: Insecta
- Order: Lepidoptera
- Family: Pyralidae
- Subfamily: Phycitinae
- Genus: Ceracanthia; Ragonot, 1893

Synonyms
- Procandiope Dyar, 1919; Drescomopsis Dyar, 1919; Procandiopa; Drescomposis

Genus of moths

Ceracanthia is a genus of snout moths. It was described by Émile Louis Ragonot in 1893.

== Species ==
- Ceracanthia alturasiana (Neunzig & Solis, 2002)
- Ceracanthia cornuta (Neunzig & Solis, 2002)
- Ceracanthia eugenieae (Neunzig & Solis, 2002)
- Ceracanthia frustrator (Heinrich, 1956)
- Ceracanthia mamella (Dyar, 1919)
- Ceracanthia pseudopeterseni (Neunzig & Solis, 2002)
- Ceracanthia schausi (Heinrich, 1956)
- Ceracanthia soraella (Druce, 1899)
- Ceracanthia squamifera (Heinrich, 1956)
- Ceracanthia squamimagna (Neunzig & Solis, 2002)
- Ceracanthia vepreculella (Ragonot, 1893)
