= Neurophyseta albinalis =

Scientific classification
- Kingdom: Animalia
- Phylum: Arthropoda
- Class: Insecta
- Order: Lepidoptera
- Family: Crambidae
- Genus: Neurophyseta
- Species: N. albinalis

Binomial name
- Neurophyseta albinalis Hampson, 1912

Synonyms
- Neurophyseta fulvilinealis Hampson, 1917; Neurophyseta dasymalis Dyar, 1926

Species of moth

Neurophyseta albinalis is a moth in the family Crambidae. It was described by George Hampson in 1912. It is found in Costa Rica, Bolivia, Brazil, Colombia, Costa Rica, Ecuador, Panama, Peru and Venezuela.
