= Lipocosma hebescalis =

Scientific classification
- Domain: Eukaryota
- Kingdom: Animalia
- Phylum: Arthropoda
- Class: Insecta
- Order: Lepidoptera
- Family: Crambidae
- Genus: Lipocosma
- Species: L. hebescalis

Binomial name
- Lipocosma hebescalis Möschler, 1890

Species of moth

Lipocosma hebescalis is a moth in the family Crambidae. It is found in Puerto Rico.
