= Ceracanthia vepreculella =

Scientific classification
- Domain: Eukaryota
- Kingdom: Animalia
- Phylum: Arthropoda
- Class: Insecta
- Order: Lepidoptera
- Family: Pyralidae
- Genus: Ceracanthia
- Species: C. vepreculella

Binomial name
- Ceracanthia vepreculella Ragonot, 1893

Species of moth

Ceracanthia vepreculella is a species of snout moth. It was described by Émile Louis Ragonot in 1893 and is known from Ecuador.
