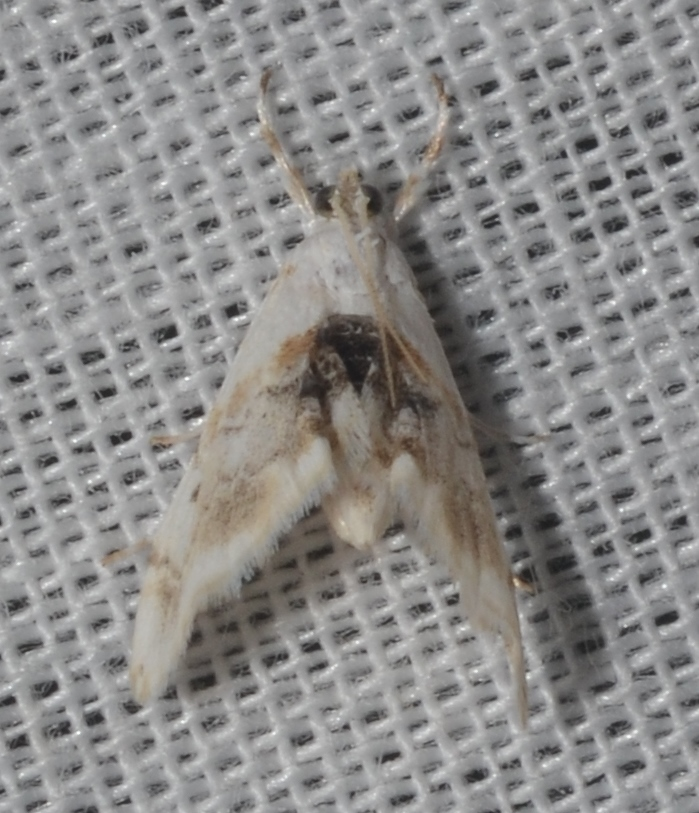

Scientific classification
- Domain: Eukaryota
- Kingdom: Animalia
- Phylum: Arthropoda
- Class: Insecta
- Order: Lepidoptera
- Family: Crambidae
- Genus: Lipocosma
- Species: L. adelalis

Binomial name
- Lipocosma adelalis (Kearfott, 1903)

Synonyms
- Symphysa adelalis Kearfott, 1903

= Lipocosma adelalis =

Species of moth

Lipocosma adelalis is a moth in the family Crambidae. It was described by William D. Kearfott in 1903. It is found in the US states of Indiana, Mississippi, Missouri, New Jersey, North Carolina, Ohio, South Carolina, Tennessee and West Virginia.

The wingspan is about 11 mm. Adults are on wing from June to August.
