= Neurophyseta arcigrammalis =

Scientific classification
- Kingdom: Animalia
- Phylum: Arthropoda
- Class: Insecta
- Order: Lepidoptera
- Family: Crambidae
- Genus: Neurophyseta
- Species: N. arcigrammalis

Binomial name
- Neurophyseta arcigrammalis Hampson, 1912

Species of moth

Neurophyseta arcigrammalis is a moth in the family Crambidae. It was described by George Hampson in 1912. It is found in São Paulo, Brazil.
