= Glaphyria basiflavalis =

Scientific classification
- Domain: Eukaryota
- Kingdom: Animalia
- Phylum: Arthropoda
- Class: Insecta
- Order: Lepidoptera
- Family: Crambidae
- Genus: Glaphyria
- Species: G. basiflavalis

Binomial name
- Glaphyria basiflavalis Barnes & McDunnough, 1913

Species of moth

Glaphyria basiflavalis, the basal-dash glaphyria moth, is a moth in the family Crambidae described by William Barnes and James Halliday McDunnough in 1913. It is found in North America, where it has been recorded from Alabama, Florida, Mississippi and Texas.
