= Neurophyseta flavirufalis =

Scientific classification
- Kingdom: Animalia
- Phylum: Arthropoda
- Class: Insecta
- Order: Lepidoptera
- Family: Crambidae
- Genus: Neurophyseta
- Species: N. flavirufalis

Binomial name
- Neurophyseta flavirufalis Hampson, 1917

Species of moth

Neurophyseta flavirufalis is a moth in the family Crambidae. It was described by George Hampson in 1917. It is found in Peru.
