= Glaphyria cymalis =

Scientific classification
- Kingdom: Animalia
- Phylum: Arthropoda
- Class: Insecta
- Order: Lepidoptera
- Family: Crambidae
- Genus: Glaphyria
- Species: G. cymalis

Binomial name
- Glaphyria cymalis (Dyar, 1914)

Synonyms
- Homophysa cymalis Dyar, 1914

Species of moth

Glaphyria cymalis is a moth in the family Crambidae. It is found in Panama.
