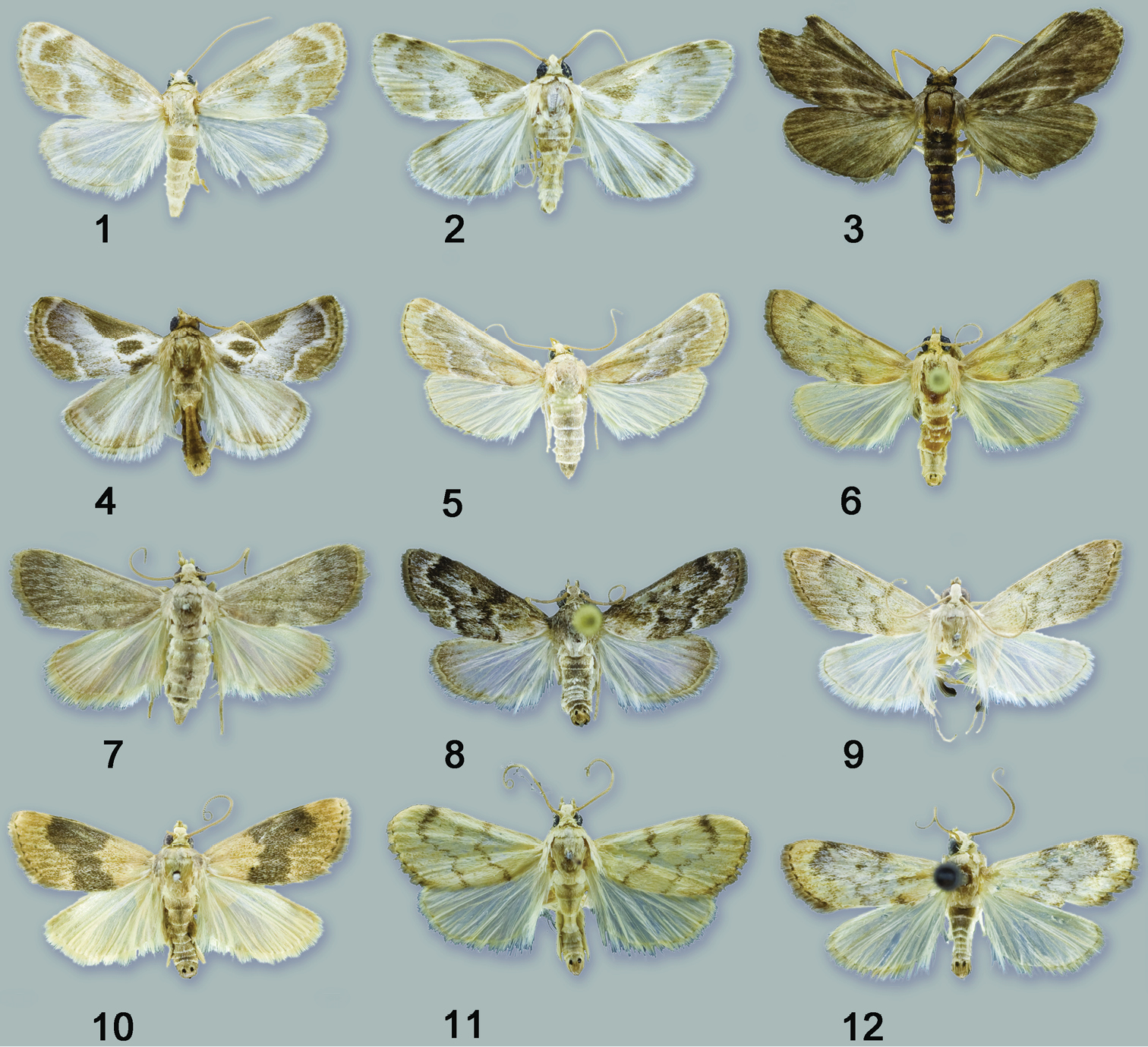
- Adults of Schacontia: 1=S. medalba, 2=S. chanesalis, 3=S. umbra, 4=S. speciosa, 5=S. ysticalis, 6=S. themis, 7=S. rasa, 8=S. nyx, 9=S. clotho, 10 & 11=S. lachesis, 12=S. atropos

Scientific classification
- Domain: Eukaryota
- Kingdom: Animalia
- Phylum: Arthropoda
- Class: Insecta
- Order: Lepidoptera
- Family: Crambidae
- Subfamily: Glaphyriinae
- Genus: Schacontia; Dyar, 1914

= Schacontia =

Genus of moths

Schacontia is a genus of moths of the family Crambidae described by Harrison Gray Dyar Jr. in 1914.

== Distribution ==
Schacontia species are distributed across Mexico, south to Central America (Guatemala, Costa Rica, Panama) and South America (Bolivia, Brazil, Ecuador, Venezuela) and the Caribbean (Puerto Rico, Cuba, Hispaniola). A single North American record of Schacontia themis is reported from Sanibel Island, Florida.

== Species ==
- Schacontia atropos Solis & Goldstein, 2013
- Schacontia chanesalis (Druce, 1899)
- Schacontia clotho Solis & Goldstein, 2013
- Schacontia lachesis Solis & Goldstein, 2013
- Schacontia medalba (Schaus, 1904)
- Schacontia nyx Solis & Goldstein, 2013
- Schacontia rasa Solis & Goldstein, 2013
- Schacontia speciosa Solis & Goldstein, 2013
- Schacontia themis Solis & Goldstein, 2013
- Schacontia umbra Solis & Goldstein, 2013
- Schacontia ysticalis (Dyar, 1925)

== Etymology ==
Schacontia seems to be Dyar's contraction of Schaus and Acontia, the noctuid genus in which William Schaus mistakenly attributed Schacontia medalba and subsequently designated by Dyar as the type species of Schacontia.
