= Glaphyria matanzalis =

Scientific classification
- Kingdom: Animalia
- Phylum: Arthropoda
- Class: Insecta
- Order: Lepidoptera
- Family: Crambidae
- Genus: Glaphyria
- Species: G. matanzalis

Binomial name
- Glaphyria matanzalis (Schaus, 1920)

Synonyms
- Symphysa matanzalis Schaus, 1920

Species of moth

Glaphyria matanzalis is a moth in the family Crambidae. It was described by Schaus in 1920. It is found in Cuba.
