= Lipocosma parcipunctalis =

Scientific classification
- Domain: Eukaryota
- Kingdom: Animalia
- Phylum: Arthropoda
- Class: Insecta
- Order: Lepidoptera
- Family: Crambidae
- Genus: Lipocosma
- Species: L. parcipunctalis

Binomial name
- Lipocosma parcipunctalis Dyar, 1914

Species of moth

Lipocosma parcipunctalis is a moth in the family Crambidae. It is found in Panama.
