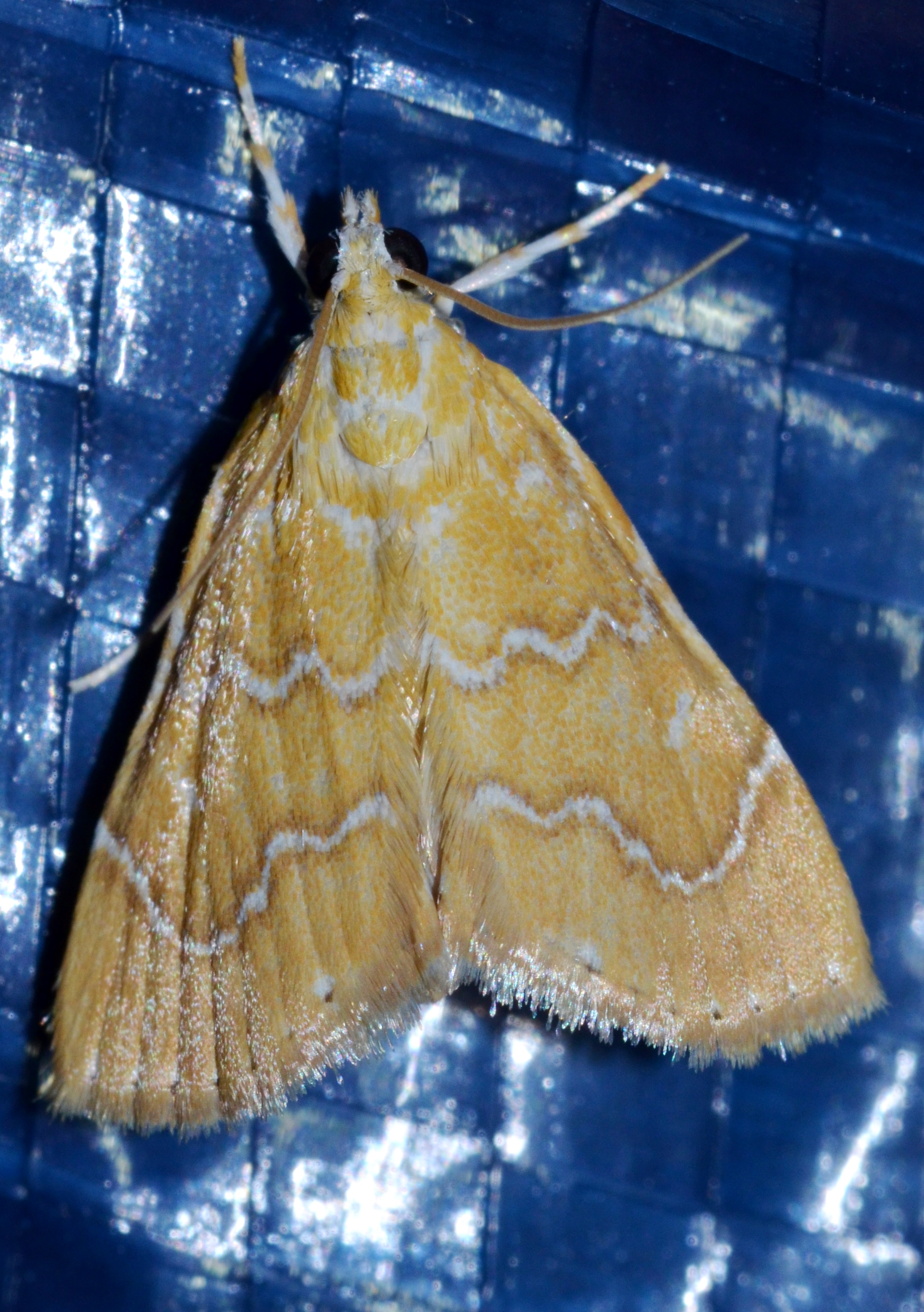

Scientific classification
- Kingdom: Animalia
- Phylum: Arthropoda
- Clade: Pancrustacea
- Class: Insecta
- Order: Lepidoptera
- Family: Crambidae
- Genus: Glaphyria
- Species: G. sesquistrialis

Binomial name
- Glaphyria sesquistrialis Hübner, 1823

Synonyms
- Glaphyria sequistrialis

= Glaphyria sesquistrialis =

Species of moth

Glaphyria sesquistrialis, the white-roped glaphyria moth, is a moth in the family Crambidae. It was described by Jacob Hübner in 1823. It is found in Honduras and North America, where it has been recorded from Ontario to Florida and from Illinois to Texas.

The larvae feed on Quercus virginiana.
