= Ceracanthia mamella =

Scientific classification
- Domain: Eukaryota
- Kingdom: Animalia
- Phylum: Arthropoda
- Class: Insecta
- Order: Lepidoptera
- Family: Pyralidae
- Genus: Ceracanthia
- Species: C. mamella

Binomial name
- Ceracanthia mamella (Dyar, 1919)

Synonyms
- Procandiopa mamella Dyar, 1919

Species of moth

Ceracanthia mamella is a species of snout moth. It was described by Harrison Gray Dyar Jr. in 1919, and is known from Costa Rica, Guatemala, and Panama.
