= Glaphyria decisa =

Scientific classification
- Kingdom: Animalia
- Phylum: Arthropoda
- Class: Insecta
- Order: Lepidoptera
- Family: Crambidae
- Genus: Glaphyria
- Species: G. decisa

Binomial name
- Glaphyria decisa (Walker, 1866)

Synonyms
- Acontia decisa Walker, 1866; Homophysa pomonalis Schaus, 1920

Species of moth

Glaphyria decisa is a moth in the family Crambidae. It was described by Francis Walker in 1866. It is found from Guatemala to south-eastern Paraguay. It is also found in Cuba.
