= Neurophyseta mineolalis =

Scientific classification
- Domain: Eukaryota
- Kingdom: Animalia
- Phylum: Arthropoda
- Class: Insecta
- Order: Lepidoptera
- Family: Crambidae
- Genus: Neurophyseta
- Species: N. mineolalis

Binomial name
- Neurophyseta mineolalis (Schaus, 1940)

Synonyms
- Ambia mineolalis Schaus, 1940

Species of moth

Neurophyseta mineolalis is a moth in the family Crambidae. It was described by Schaus in 1940. It is found in Puerto Rico.
