= Lipocosma polingi =

Scientific classification
- Kingdom: Animalia
- Phylum: Arthropoda
- Clade: Pancrustacea
- Class: Insecta
- Order: Lepidoptera
- Family: Crambidae
- Genus: Lipocosma
- Species: L. polingi

Binomial name
- Lipocosma polingi Munroe, 1972

Species of moth

Lipocosma polingi is a moth in the family Crambidae. It is found in North America, where it has been recorded from Arizona (Baboquivari Mountains) and central and southern Texas.

The length of the forewings is about 6 mm. Adults are on wing from May to October.

The larvae possibly feed on Quercus species.
