= Neurophyseta narcissusalis =

Scientific classification
- Kingdom: Animalia
- Phylum: Arthropoda
- Class: Insecta
- Order: Lepidoptera
- Family: Crambidae
- Genus: Neurophyseta
- Species: N. narcissusalis

Binomial name
- Neurophyseta narcissusalis (Walker, 1859)

Synonyms
- Cymoriza narcissusalis Walker, 1859

Species of moth

Neurophyseta narcissusalis is a moth in the family Crambidae. It was described by Francis Walker in 1859. It is found in Brazil.
