= Glaphyria pupillalis =

Scientific classification
- Domain: Eukaryota
- Kingdom: Animalia
- Phylum: Arthropoda
- Class: Insecta
- Order: Lepidoptera
- Family: Crambidae
- Genus: Glaphyria
- Species: G. pupillalis

Binomial name
- Glaphyria pupillalis (Möschler, 1886)

Synonyms
- Berdura pupillalis Möschler, 1886

Species of moth

Glaphyria pupillalis is a moth in the family Crambidae. It was described by Heinrich Benno Möschler in 1886. It is found in Jamaica.
