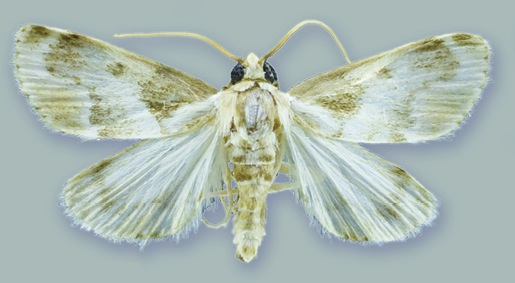

Scientific classification
- Domain: Eukaryota
- Kingdom: Animalia
- Phylum: Arthropoda
- Class: Insecta
- Order: Lepidoptera
- Family: Crambidae
- Genus: Schacontia
- Species: S. chanesalis

Binomial name
- Schacontia chanesalis (H. Druce, 1899)

Synonyms
- Pionea chanesalis H. Druce, 1899; Schacontia replica Dyar, 1914; Schacontia pfeifferi Amsel, 1956

= Schacontia chanesalis =

Species of moth

Schacontia chanesalis is a moth of the family Crambidae described by Herbert Druce in 1899. It is found in Mexico, Guatemala, Costa Rica and Venezuela.

The length of the forewings is 4.5–9 mm. The baso-costal triangle on the forewings is flanked by white scaling towards the inner margin and in the medial area, which is outwardly shaded brown. The postmedial area is greyish brown. The ground colour of the hindwings is white or very light grey, but darker postmedially.

Larvae have been reared from Podandrogyne decipiense.
