= Neurophyseta albimarginalis =

Scientific classification
- Domain: Eukaryota
- Kingdom: Animalia
- Phylum: Arthropoda
- Class: Insecta
- Order: Lepidoptera
- Family: Crambidae
- Genus: Neurophyseta
- Species: N. albimarginalis

Binomial name
- Neurophyseta albimarginalis Schaus, 1920

Species of moth

Neurophyseta albimarginalis is a moth in the family Crambidae. It was described by William Schaus in 1920. It is found in Guatemala.

The wingspan is about 20 mm. The base, costal and outer margins of the forewings are white. There is a vertical antemedial line which is brown on the costa, but otherwise black. It is preceded by a grey shade below the cell and on the inner margin. The hindwings are brownish purple, but the base, inner margin and the costal and outer margins are white. There is a black curved antemedial line.
