= Schacontia ysticalis =

Scientific classification
- Kingdom: Animalia
- Phylum: Arthropoda
- Class: Insecta
- Order: Lepidoptera
- Family: Crambidae
- Genus: Schacontia
- Species: S. ysticalis

Binomial name
- Schacontia ysticalis (Dyar, 1925)

Synonyms
- Thlecteria ysticalis Dyar, 1925

Species of moth

Schacontia ysticalis is a moth of the family Crambidae described by Harrison Gray Dyar Jr. in 1925. It is found in Mexico, Costa Rica, Honduras, Nicaragua, Venezuela and Bolivia.

The length of the forewings is 7–11 mm. The basal, antemedial, and subterminal fasciae of the forewings are brownish orange. The hindwings are yellowed at the margin. Adults have been recorded on wing in mid-June (in Mexico), from January to June (in Costa Rica), from March to April (in Nicaragua), from April to May (in Venezuela) and in December (in Bolivia).
