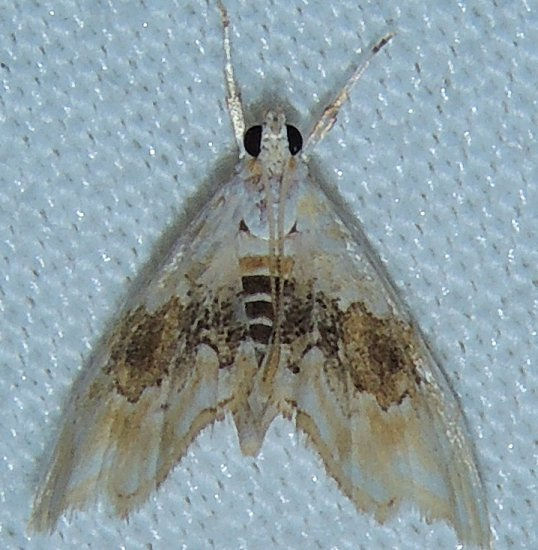
- Lipocosma sicalis

Scientific classification
- Kingdom: Animalia
- Phylum: Arthropoda
- Clade: Pancrustacea
- Class: Insecta
- Order: Lepidoptera
- Family: Crambidae
- Subfamily: Glaphyriinae
- Genus: Lipocosma; Lederer, 1863

Synonyms
- Clarkeiodes Amsel, 1957; Clarkeia Amsel, 1956; Lipocosmopsis Munroe, 1964

= Lipocosma =

Genus of moths

Lipocosma is a genus of moths of the family Crambidae.

== Species ==
- Lipocosma adelalis (Kearfott, 1903)
- Lipocosma albibasalis (Hampson, 1906)
- Lipocosma albinibasalis
- Lipocosma antonialis
- Lipocosma ausonialis (Druce, 1899)
- Lipocosma calla (Kaye, 1901)
- Lipocosma chiralis Schaus, 1920
- Lipocosma coroicalis
- Lipocosma diabata
- Lipocosma fonsecai Solis & Adamski, 1998
- Lipocosma forsteri
- Lipocosma furvalis (Hampson, 1912)
- Lipocosma grimbaldalis
- Lipocosma hebescalis
- Lipocosma intermedialis
- Lipocosma isola
- Lipocosma nigripictalis
- Lipocosma nigrisquamalis Hampson, 1912
- Lipocosma parcipunctalis
- Lipocosma pitilia Solis & Adamski, 1998
- Lipocosma polingi
- Lipocosma rosalia Solis & Adamski, 1998
- Lipocosma sabulalis
- Lipocosma saralis
- Lipocosma septa Munroe, 1972
- Lipocosma sicalis Walker, 1859
- Lipocosma teutonialis
