= Neurophyseta bolusalis =

Scientific classification
- Kingdom: Animalia
- Phylum: Arthropoda
- Class: Insecta
- Order: Lepidoptera
- Family: Crambidae
- Genus: Neurophyseta
- Species: N. bolusalis

Binomial name
- Neurophyseta bolusalis (Walker, 1859)

Synonyms
- Cymoriza bolusalis Walker, 1859; Ambia bolusalis

Species of moth

Neurophyseta bolusalis is a moth in the family Crambidae. It is found in Brazil (Rio de Janeiro).

The wings are white with five luteous undulating brown-bordered bands, here and there connected by streaks.
