= Lipocosma albibasalis =

Scientific classification
- Kingdom: Animalia
- Phylum: Arthropoda
- Class: Insecta
- Order: Lepidoptera
- Family: Crambidae
- Genus: Lipocosma
- Species: L. albibasalis

Binomial name
- Lipocosma albibasalis (Hampson, 1906)

Synonyms
- Ambia albibasalis Hampson, 1906

Species of moth

Lipocosma albibasalis is a moth in the family Crambidae. It is found from Costa Rica to coastal Brazil.

The ground colour of the forewings is white with pale brown fasciae and lines.
