= Neurophyseta paroalis =

Scientific classification
- Domain: Eukaryota
- Kingdom: Animalia
- Phylum: Arthropoda
- Class: Insecta
- Order: Lepidoptera
- Family: Crambidae
- Genus: Neurophyseta
- Species: N. paroalis

Binomial name
- Neurophyseta paroalis (Schaus, 1906)

Synonyms
- Cymoriza paroalis Schaus, 1906; Cataclysta paroalis; Oligostigma andeolalis Schaus, 1924

Species of moth

Neurophyseta paroalis is a moth in the family Crambidae. It was described by Schaus in 1906. It is found in Brazil.
