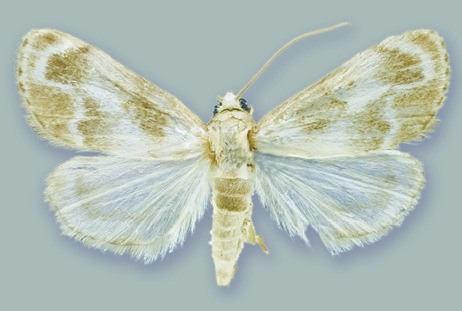
- Male

Scientific classification
- Domain: Eukaryota
- Kingdom: Animalia
- Phylum: Arthropoda
- Class: Insecta
- Order: Lepidoptera
- Family: Crambidae
- Genus: Schacontia
- Species: S. medalba

Binomial name
- Schacontia medalba (Schaus, 1904)

Synonyms
- Acontia medalba Schaus, 1904

= Schacontia medalba =

Species of moth

Schacontia medalba is a moth of the family Crambidae described by William Schaus in 1904. It is found in Brazil and Peru.

The length of the forewings is 6.5–10 mm. The basal area of the forewings is primarily grey brown. The terminal area of the hindwings is lightly shaded.
