= Neurophyseta arcuatalis =

Scientific classification
- Kingdom: Animalia
- Phylum: Arthropoda
- Class: Insecta
- Order: Lepidoptera
- Family: Crambidae
- Genus: Neurophyseta
- Species: N. arcuatalis

Binomial name
- Neurophyseta arcuatalis Hampson, 1912

Species of moth

Neurophyseta arcuatalis is a moth in the family Crambidae. It was described by George Hampson in 1912. It is found in Costa Rica and Guatemala.
