= Glaphyria tripunctalis =

Scientific classification
- Domain: Eukaryota
- Kingdom: Animalia
- Phylum: Arthropoda
- Class: Insecta
- Order: Lepidoptera
- Family: Crambidae
- Genus: Glaphyria
- Species: G. tripunctalis

Binomial name
- Glaphyria tripunctalis (Amsel, 1956)

Synonyms
- Scybalista tripunctalis Amsel, 1956

Species of moth

Glaphyria tripunctalis is a moth in the family Crambidae. It was described by Hans Georg Amsel in 1956. It is found in Venezuela.
