= Glaphyria peremptalis =

Scientific classification
- Kingdom: Animalia
- Phylum: Arthropoda
- Class: Insecta
- Order: Lepidoptera
- Family: Crambidae
- Genus: Glaphyria
- Species: G. peremptalis

Binomial name
- Glaphyria peremptalis (Grote, 1878)

Synonyms
- Homophysa peremptalis Grote, 1878

Species of moth

Glaphyria peremptalis is a moth in the family Crambidae. It is found in North America, where it has been recorded from Massachusetts, North Carolina and Texas.

The wingspan is about 13 mm. Adults have been recorded on wing in May and from August to September.
