= Glaphyria leucostactalis =

Scientific classification
- Kingdom: Animalia
- Phylum: Arthropoda
- Class: Insecta
- Order: Lepidoptera
- Family: Crambidae
- Genus: Glaphyria
- Species: G. leucostactalis

Binomial name
- Glaphyria leucostactalis (Hampson, 1912)

Synonyms
- Scybalista leucostactalis Hampson, 1912

Species of moth

Glaphyria leucostactalis is a moth in the family Crambidae. It was described by George Hampson in 1912. It is found in Peru.
