= Neurophyseta hoenei =

Scientific classification
- Kingdom: Animalia
- Phylum: Arthropoda
- Class: Insecta
- Order: Lepidoptera
- Family: Crambidae
- Genus: Neurophyseta
- Species: N. hoenei

Binomial name
- Neurophyseta hoenei (Caradja in Caradja & Meyrick, 1934)

Synonyms
- Cymoriza hoenei Caradja in Caradja & Meyrick, 1934

Species of moth

Neurophyseta hoenei is a moth in the family Crambidae. It was described by Aristide Caradja in 1934. It is found in Guangdong, China.
