= Lipocosma diabata =

Scientific classification
- Domain: Eukaryota
- Kingdom: Animalia
- Phylum: Arthropoda
- Class: Insecta
- Order: Lepidoptera
- Family: Crambidae
- Genus: Lipocosma
- Species: L. diabata

Binomial name
- Lipocosma diabata Dyar, 1917

Species of moth

Lipocosma diabata is a moth in the family Crambidae. It is found in North America, where it has been recorded from Florida.
