= Lipocosma saralis =

Scientific classification
- Domain: Eukaryota
- Kingdom: Animalia
- Phylum: Arthropoda
- Class: Insecta
- Order: Lepidoptera
- Family: Crambidae
- Genus: Lipocosma
- Species: L. saralis

Binomial name
- Lipocosma saralis Munroe, 1964

Species of moth

Lipocosma saralis is a moth in the family Crambidae. It is found in Bolivia.
