= Glaphyria flavidalis =

Scientific classification
- Kingdom: Animalia
- Phylum: Arthropoda
- Class: Insecta
- Order: Lepidoptera
- Family: Crambidae
- Genus: Glaphyria
- Species: G. flavidalis

Binomial name
- Glaphyria flavidalis (Hampson, 1912)

Synonyms
- Homophysa flavidalis Hampson, 1912; Homophysa condensata Meyrick, 1933

Species of moth

Glaphyria flavidalis is a moth in the family Crambidae. It was described by George Hampson in 1912. It is found in Paraguay and Argentina.
