= Glaphyria potentalis =

Scientific classification
- Domain: Eukaryota
- Kingdom: Animalia
- Phylum: Arthropoda
- Class: Insecta
- Order: Lepidoptera
- Family: Crambidae
- Genus: Glaphyria
- Species: G. potentalis

Binomial name
- Glaphyria potentalis (Dyar, 1914)

Synonyms
- Scybalista potentalis Dyar, 1914

Species of moth

Glaphyria potentalis is a moth in the family Crambidae. It is found in Panama and Costa Rica.
