= Neurophyseta taiwanalis =

Scientific classification
- Domain: Eukaryota
- Kingdom: Animalia
- Phylum: Arthropoda
- Class: Insecta
- Order: Lepidoptera
- Family: Crambidae
- Genus: Neurophyseta
- Species: N. taiwanalis

Binomial name
- Neurophyseta taiwanalis (Shibuya, 1928)

Synonyms
- Cymoriza taiwanalis Shibuya, 1928

Species of moth

Neurophyseta taiwanalis is a moth in the family Crambidae. It was described by Shibuya in 1928. It is found in Taiwan.
