= Lipocosma intermedialis =

Scientific classification
- Domain: Eukaryota
- Kingdom: Animalia
- Phylum: Arthropoda
- Class: Insecta
- Order: Lepidoptera
- Family: Crambidae
- Genus: Lipocosma
- Species: L. intermedialis

Binomial name
- Lipocosma intermedialis Barnes & McDunnough, 1912

Species of moth

Lipocosma intermedialis is a moth in the family Crambidae first described by William Barnes and James Halliday McDunnough in 1912. It is found in North America, where it has been recorded from Texas and Maryland.
