= Cosmopterosis thetysalis =

Scientific classification
- Kingdom: Animalia
- Phylum: Arthropoda
- Class: Insecta
- Order: Lepidoptera
- Family: Crambidae
- Genus: Cosmopterosis
- Species: C. thetysalis

Binomial name
- Cosmopterosis thetysalis (Walker, 1859)

Synonyms
- Cataclysta thetysalis Walker, 1859

Species of moth

Cosmopterosis thetysalis is a moth in the family Crambidae described by Francis Walker in 1859. It is found from southern Venezuela and north-western Brazil north to the coast of Suriname and French Guiana.
