= Lipocosma sabulalis =

Scientific classification
- Domain: Eukaryota
- Kingdom: Animalia
- Phylum: Arthropoda
- Class: Insecta
- Order: Lepidoptera
- Family: Crambidae
- Genus: Lipocosma
- Species: L. sabulalis

Binomial name
- Lipocosma sabulalis (Amsel, 1956)

Synonyms
- Clarkeia sabulalis Amsel, 1956

Species of moth

Lipocosma sabulalis is a moth in the family Crambidae. It is found in Venezuela.
