= Lipocosma coroicalis =

Scientific classification
- Domain: Eukaryota
- Kingdom: Animalia
- Phylum: Arthropoda
- Class: Insecta
- Order: Lepidoptera
- Family: Crambidae
- Genus: Lipocosma
- Species: L. coroicalis

Binomial name
- Lipocosma coroicalis Munroe, 1964

Species of moth

Lipocosma coroicalis is a moth in the family Crambidae. It is found in Bolivia.
