= Neurophyseta laothoealis =

Scientific classification
- Kingdom: Animalia
- Phylum: Arthropoda
- Class: Insecta
- Order: Lepidoptera
- Family: Crambidae
- Genus: Neurophyseta
- Species: N. laothoealis

Binomial name
- Neurophyseta laothoealis (Walker, 1859)

Synonyms
- Hydrocampa laothoealis Walker, 1859

Species of moth

Neurophyseta laothoealis is a moth in the family Crambidae. It was described by Francis Walker in 1859. It is found in Venezuela.
