= Neurophyseta debalis =

Scientific classification
- Domain: Eukaryota
- Kingdom: Animalia
- Phylum: Arthropoda
- Class: Insecta
- Order: Lepidoptera
- Family: Crambidae
- Genus: Neurophyseta
- Species: N. debalis

Binomial name
- Neurophyseta debalis (H. Druce, 1896)

Synonyms
- Hyrdrocampa debalis H. Druce, 1896

Species of moth

Neurophyseta debalis is a moth in the family Crambidae. It was described by Herbert Druce in 1896. It is found in Brazil, Costa Rica, Guatemala and Mexico.
