= Lipocosma chiralis =

Scientific classification
- Kingdom: Animalia
- Phylum: Arthropoda
- Class: Insecta
- Order: Lepidoptera
- Family: Crambidae
- Genus: Lipocosma
- Species: L. chiralis

Binomial name
- Lipocosma chiralis Schaus, 1920

Species of moth

Lipocosma chiralis is a moth in the family Crambidae. The moth was described by Schaus in 1920, and today is found in Cuba.

The wingspan is about 12 mm. The base of the forewings is white up to the middle of the costa and to one-third of the inner margin. It is bordered by a golden brown shade on the costa. The hindwings are silvery white with a black spot on the inner margin. There is a postmedial brown line and a brown terminal shade.
