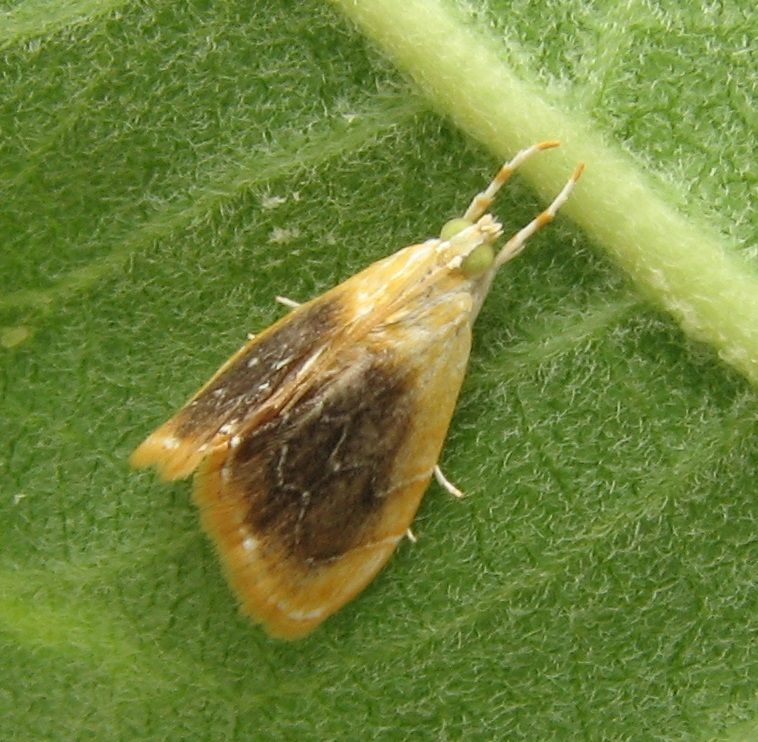

Scientific classification
- Domain: Eukaryota
- Kingdom: Animalia
- Phylum: Arthropoda
- Class: Insecta
- Order: Lepidoptera
- Family: Crambidae
- Genus: Glaphyria
- Species: G. fulminalis

Binomial name
- Glaphyria fulminalis (Lederer, 1863)

Synonyms
- Homophysa fulminalis Lederer, 1863

= Glaphyria fulminalis =

Species of moth

Glaphyria fulminalis, the black-patched glaphyria, is a species of moth of the family Crambidae described by Julius Lederer in 1863. It is found in the eastern part of the United States, from Connecticut to Florida, west to Texas and Illinois.

The wingspan is about 11 millimetres (0.43 in). Adults are on wing from May to August.
