= Glaphyria acutalis =

Scientific classification
- Domain: Eukaryota
- Kingdom: Animalia
- Phylum: Arthropoda
- Class: Insecta
- Order: Lepidoptera
- Family: Crambidae
- Genus: Glaphyria
- Species: G. acutalis

Binomial name
- Glaphyria acutalis (Warren, 1891)

Synonyms
- Scybalista acutalis Warren, 1891; Eupoca acutalis

Species of moth

Glaphyria acutalis is a moth in the family Crambidae. It is found in Peru.
