= Glaphyria badierana =

Scientific classification
- Domain: Eukaryota
- Kingdom: Animalia
- Phylum: Arthropoda
- Class: Insecta
- Order: Lepidoptera
- Family: Crambidae
- Genus: Glaphyria
- Species: G. bilinealis

Binomial name
- Glaphyria bilinealis (Fabricius, 1794)

Synonyms
- Pyralis badierana Fabricius, 1794; Glaphyria banderiana; Homophysa bilinealis Walker, 1865; Homophysa leucostictalis Hampson, 1895

Species of moth

Glaphyria bilinealis is a moth in the family Crambidae. It is found in Cuba, Jamaica, Puerto Rico and on the Virgin Islands.
