= Neurophyseta dabiusalis =

Scientific classification
- Kingdom: Animalia
- Phylum: Arthropoda
- Clade: Pancrustacea
- Class: Insecta
- Order: Lepidoptera
- Family: Crambidae
- Genus: Neurophyseta
- Species: N. dabiusalis

Binomial name
- Neurophyseta dabiusalis (Schaus, 1924)

Synonyms
- Parthenodes dabiusalis Schaus, 1924

Species of moth

Neurophyseta dabiusalis is a moth in the family Crambidae. It is found in Mexico.

The wingspan is about 18 mm. The base of the forewings is white up to a fine medial black line and almost entirely suffused with cinnamon buff, leaving a little white on the costa and along the line. The hindwings are white, with a short antemedial line on the inner margin.
