= Ceracanthia schausi =

Scientific classification
- Domain: Eukaryota
- Kingdom: Animalia
- Phylum: Arthropoda
- Class: Insecta
- Order: Lepidoptera
- Family: Pyralidae
- Genus: Ceracanthia
- Species: C. schausi

Binomial name
- Ceracanthia schausi (Heinrich, 1956)

Synonyms
- Megarthria schausi Heinrich, 1956

Species of moth

Ceracanthia schausi is a species of snout moth. It was described by Carl Heinrich in 1956 and is known from Costa Rica and Belize.
