= Neurophyseta irrectalis =

Scientific classification
- Kingdom: Animalia
- Phylum: Arthropoda
- Class: Insecta
- Order: Lepidoptera
- Family: Crambidae
- Genus: Neurophyseta
- Species: N. irrectalis

Binomial name
- Neurophyseta irrectalis (Guenée, 1854)

Synonyms
- Cymoriza irrectalis Guenée, 1854

Species of moth

Neurophyseta irrectalis is a moth in the family Crambidae. It was described by Achille Guenée in 1854. It is found in north-eastern India and Taiwan.
