= Neurophyseta laudamialis =

Scientific classification
- Kingdom: Animalia
- Phylum: Arthropoda
- Class: Insecta
- Order: Lepidoptera
- Family: Crambidae
- Genus: Neurophyseta
- Species: N. laudamialis

Binomial name
- Neurophyseta laudamialis (Walker, 1859)

Synonyms
- Hydrocampa laudamialis Walker, 1859; Leucochroma subpuralis Walker, 1865

Species of moth

Neurophyseta laudamialis is a moth in the family Crambidae. It was described by Francis Walker in 1859. It is found in Venezuela.

The hindwings are pure white, with a mostly brown disk, including an elongated white lunule and a short straight exterior white line. The submarginal line is black and the costa is mostly luteous (yellowish), with a black dot near the base and another by the exterior line, as well as a brown oblique line near the base, interrupted by a black discal spot. There are two diffuse brown lines on the hindwings.
