= Neurophyseta mollitalis =

Scientific classification
- Domain: Eukaryota
- Kingdom: Animalia
- Phylum: Arthropoda
- Class: Insecta
- Order: Lepidoptera
- Family: Crambidae
- Genus: Neurophyseta
- Species: N. mollitalis

Binomial name
- Neurophyseta mollitalis (Schaus, 1912)

Synonyms
- Oligostigma mollitalis Schaus, 1912

Species of moth

Neurophyseta mollitalis is a moth in the family Crambidae. It was described by William Schaus in 1912. It is found in Bolivia, Colombia, Costa Rica and Panama.
