= Lipocosma calla =

Scientific classification
- Domain: Eukaryota
- Kingdom: Animalia
- Phylum: Arthropoda
- Class: Insecta
- Order: Lepidoptera
- Family: Crambidae
- Genus: Lipocosma
- Species: L. calla

Binomial name
- Lipocosma calla (Kaye, 1901)

Synonyms
- Neurophyseta calla Kaye, 1901; Homophysa calla; Glaphyria calla

Species of insect

Lipocosma calla is a moth in the family Crambidae. It was described by William James Kaye in 1901. It is found from southern Mexico south through Central America to northern South America.
