= Glaphyria dolatalis =

Scientific classification
- Domain: Eukaryota
- Kingdom: Animalia
- Phylum: Arthropoda
- Class: Insecta
- Order: Lepidoptera
- Family: Crambidae
- Genus: Glaphyria
- Species: G. dolatalis

Binomial name
- Glaphyria dolatalis (Möschler, 1890)

Synonyms
- Homophysa dolatalis Möschler, 1890

Species of moth

Glaphyria dolatalis is a moth in the family Crambidae. It is found in Puerto Rico.
