= Neurophyseta disciatralis =

Scientific classification
- Kingdom: Animalia
- Phylum: Arthropoda
- Class: Insecta
- Order: Lepidoptera
- Family: Crambidae
- Genus: Neurophyseta
- Species: N. disciatralis

Binomial name
- Neurophyseta disciatralis Hampson, 1917

Species of moth

Neurophyseta disciatralis is a moth in the family Crambidae. It was described by George Hampson in 1917. It is found in Peru.

The wingspan is about 22 mm. The forewings are silvery white with a black point at the base of the costa and a minute black spot on the vein near the base. There are subbasal black striae on and below the costa with an orange bar between them. The hindwing base is silvery white with a slight brown antemedial line.
