= Conant's garter snake =

Scientific classification
- Kingdom: Animalia
- Phylum: Chordata
- Class: Reptilia
- Order: Squamata
- Suborder: Serpentes
- Family: Colubridae
- Genus: Thamnophis
- Species: T. conanti

Binomial name
- Thamnophis conanti Rossman & Burbrink, 2005

Species of snake

Conant's garter snake (Thamnophis conanti) is a species of snake in the family Colubridae. The species is endemic to Mexico.

== Etymology ==
The specific name conanti is in honor of the American herpetologist Roger Conant.

== Geographic range ==
T. conanti is found in the Mexican states of Puebla and Veracruz.

== Habitat ==
The preferred habitat of T. conanti is oak woodland at elevations above 2,000 m (6,600 ft).

== Reproduction ==
T. conanti is viviparous.
