= Neurophyseta pomperialis =

Scientific classification
- Domain: Eukaryota
- Kingdom: Animalia
- Phylum: Arthropoda
- Class: Insecta
- Order: Lepidoptera
- Family: Crambidae
- Genus: Neurophyseta
- Species: N. pomperialis

Binomial name
- Neurophyseta pomperialis (H. Druce, 1896)

Synonyms
- Hydrocampa pomperialis H. Druce, 1896

Species of moth

Neurophyseta pomperialis is a moth in the family Crambidae. It was described by Herbert Druce in 1896. It is found in Costa Rica and Mexico.
