= Lipocosma furvalis =

Scientific classification
- Kingdom: Animalia
- Phylum: Arthropoda
- Class: Insecta
- Order: Lepidoptera
- Family: Crambidae
- Genus: Lipocosma
- Species: L. furvalis

Binomial name
- Lipocosma furvalis (Hampson, 1912)

Synonyms
- Homophysa furvalis Hampson, 1912

Species of moth

Lipocosma furvalis is a moth in the family Crambidae. It was described by George Hampson in 1912. It is found from Mexico south to Costa Rica and the Lesser Antilles.
