= Glaphyria albifascialis =

Scientific classification
- Kingdom: Animalia
- Phylum: Arthropoda
- Class: Insecta
- Order: Lepidoptera
- Family: Crambidae
- Genus: Glaphyria
- Species: G. albifascialis

Binomial name
- Glaphyria albifascialis (Hampson, 1912)

Synonyms
- Homophysa albifascialis Hampson, 1912

Species of moth

Glaphyria albifascialis is a moth in the family Crambidae. It was described by George Hampson in 1912. It is found in Argentina.
