= Neurophyseta comoralis =

Scientific classification
- Domain: Eukaryota
- Kingdom: Animalia
- Phylum: Arthropoda
- Class: Insecta
- Order: Lepidoptera
- Family: Crambidae
- Genus: Neurophyseta
- Species: N. comoralis

Binomial name
- Neurophyseta comoralis (Strand, 1916)

Synonyms
- Cymoriza comoralis Strand, 1916; Cymoriza imperialis Marion, 1954

Species of moth

Neurophyseta comoralis is a moth in the family Crambidae. It was described by Strand in 1916. It is found on the Comoros, where it has been recorded from Anjouan.
