= Neurophyseta clymenalis =

Scientific classification
- Kingdom: Animalia
- Phylum: Arthropoda
- Class: Insecta
- Order: Lepidoptera
- Family: Crambidae
- Genus: Neurophyseta
- Species: N. clymenalis

Binomial name
- Neurophyseta clymenalis (Walker, 1859)

Synonyms
- Hydrocampa clymenalis Walker, 1859; Stenia praestrictalis Lederer, 1863; Stenia saurialis Lederer, 1863

Species of moth

Neurophyseta clymenalis is a moth in the family Crambidae. It was described by Francis Walker in 1859. It is found in Bolivia, Brazil, Colombia, Costa Rica, Dominica, Ecuador, El Salvador, Guatemala, Mexico, Peru and Venezuela.
