= Neurophyseta phaeozonalis =

Scientific classification
- Kingdom: Animalia
- Phylum: Arthropoda
- Class: Insecta
- Order: Lepidoptera
- Family: Crambidae
- Genus: Neurophyseta
- Species: N. phaeozonalis

Binomial name
- Neurophyseta phaeozonalis (Hampson, 1906)

Synonyms
- Ambia phaeozonalis Hampson, 1906

Species of moth

Neurophyseta phaeozonalis is a moth in the family Crambidae. It was described by George Hampson in 1906. It is found in Guerrero, Mexico.
