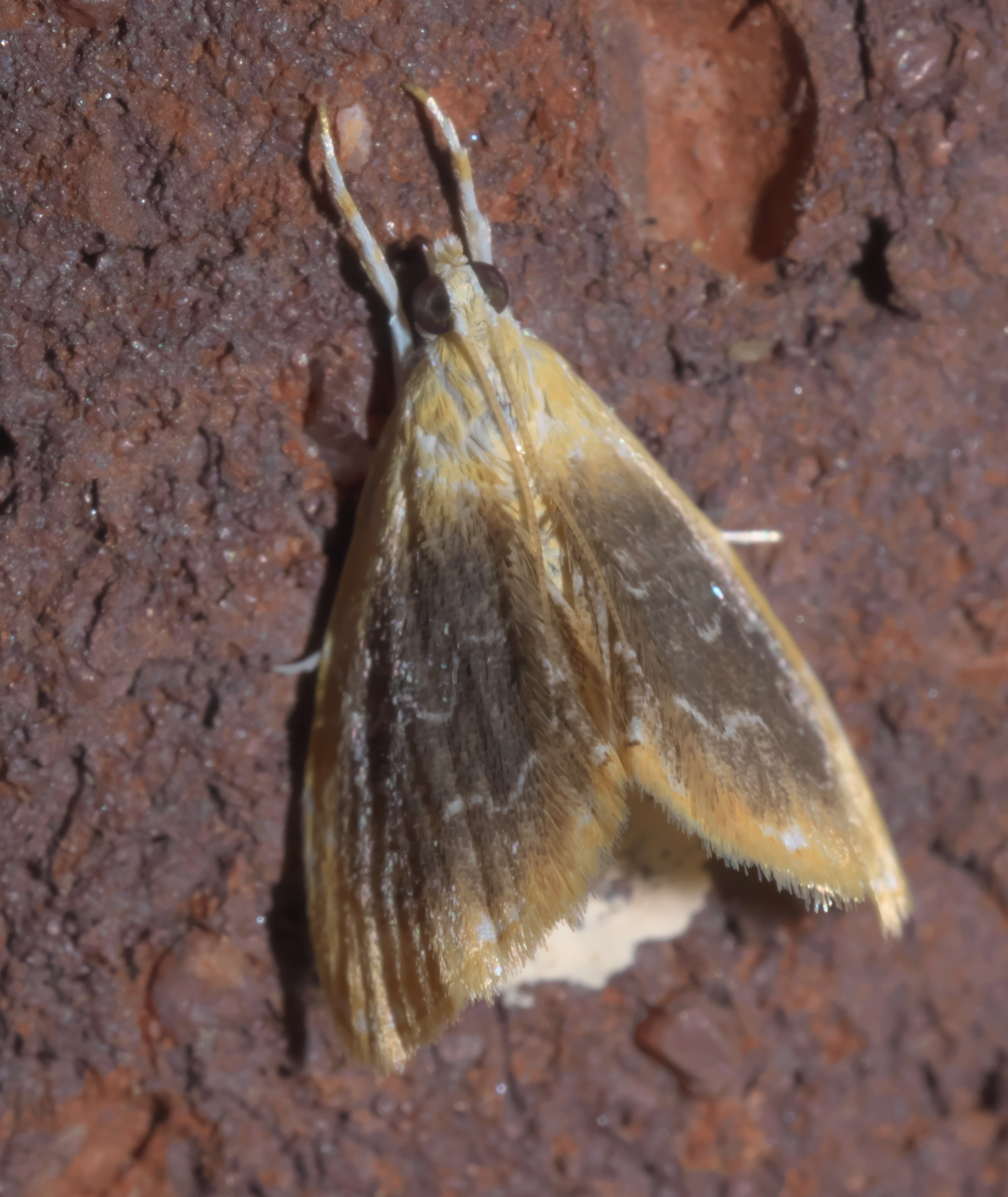

Scientific classification
- Domain: Eukaryota
- Kingdom: Animalia
- Phylum: Arthropoda
- Class: Insecta
- Order: Lepidoptera
- Family: Crambidae
- Genus: Glaphyria
- Species: G. cappsi

Binomial name
- Glaphyria cappsi Munroe, 1972

= Glaphyria cappsi =

Species of moth

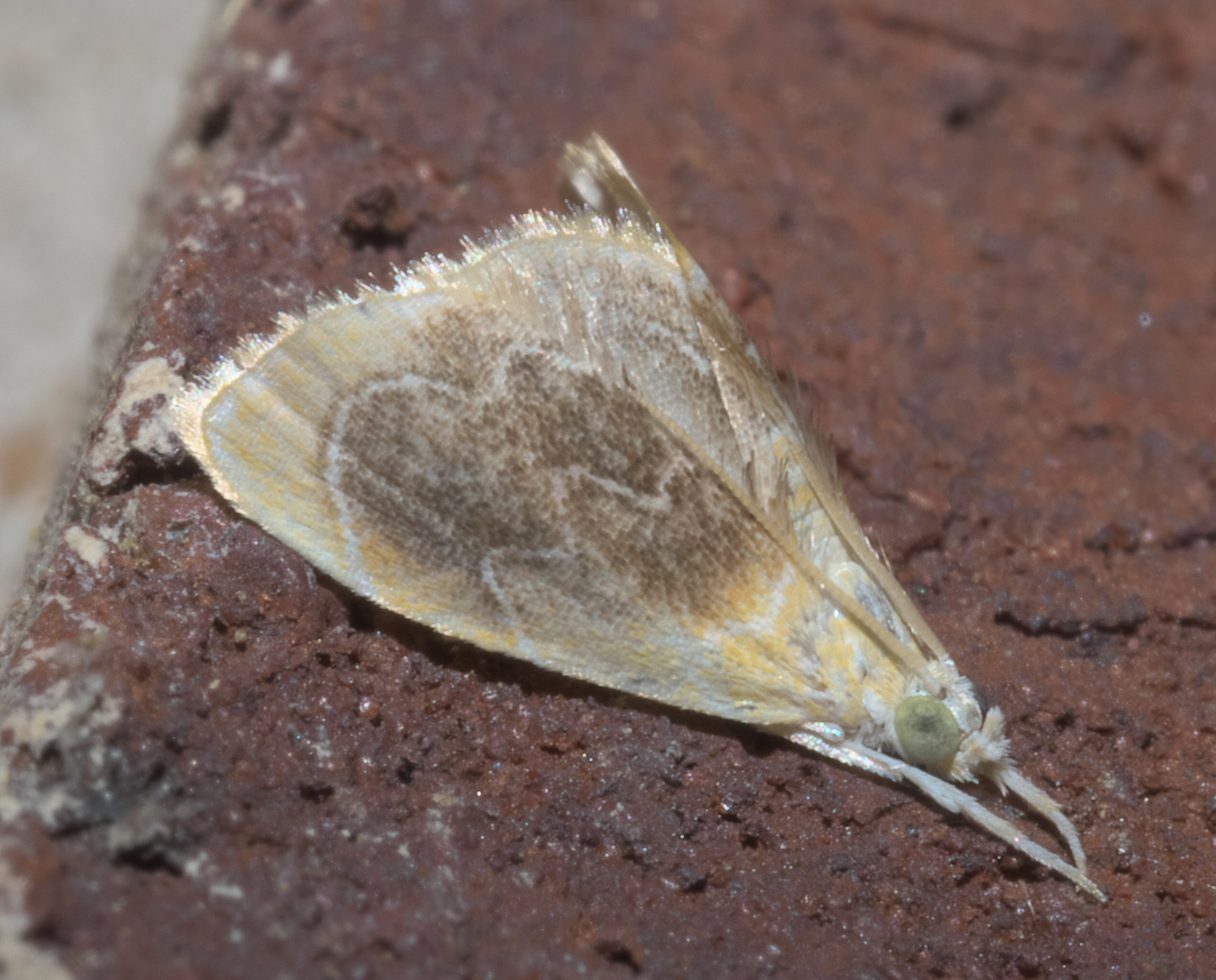
Glaphyria cappsi, Hodges #4874, Size: 6.6 mm

Glaphyria cappsi is a moth in the family Crambidae. It is found in North America, where it has been recorded from Alabama, Florida, Georgia, Maryland, North Carolina, Oklahoma and South Carolina. It is also found in Cuba.

The wingspan is about 13 mm. Adults have been recorded on wing from January and from March to November in Florida.
