= Glaphyria ochrofusalis =

Scientific classification
- Domain: Eukaryota
- Kingdom: Animalia
- Phylum: Arthropoda
- Class: Insecta
- Order: Lepidoptera
- Family: Crambidae
- Genus: Glaphyria
- Species: G. ochrofusalis

Binomial name
- Glaphyria ochrofusalis (Amsel, 1956)

Synonyms
- Scybalista ochrofusalis Amsel, 1956

Species of moth

Glaphyria ochrofusalis is a moth in the family Crambidae. It was described by Hans Georg Amsel in 1956. It is found in Venezuela.
