= Glaphyria argentipunctalis =

Scientific classification
- Kingdom: Animalia
- Phylum: Arthropoda
- Class: Insecta
- Order: Lepidoptera
- Family: Crambidae
- Genus: Glaphyria
- Species: G. argentipunctalis

Binomial name
- Glaphyria argentipunctalis (Amsel, 1956)

Synonyms
- Scybalista argentipunctalis Amsel, 1956

Moth in the family Crambidae

Glaphyria argentipunctalis is a moth in the family Crambidae. It was described by Hans Georg Amsel in 1956. It is found in Venezuela.
