= Neurophyseta purifactalis =

Scientific classification
- Kingdom: Animalia
- Phylum: Arthropoda
- Class: Insecta
- Order: Lepidoptera
- Family: Crambidae
- Genus: Neurophyseta
- Species: N. purifactalis

Binomial name
- Neurophyseta purifactalis (Dyar, 1914)

Synonyms
- Oligostigma purifactalis Dyar, 1914

Species of moth

Neurophyseta purifactalis is a moth in the family Crambidae. It was described by Harrison Gray Dyar Jr. in 1914. It is found in Costa Rica and Panama.
