= Neurophyseta durgalis =

Scientific classification
- Domain: Eukaryota
- Kingdom: Animalia
- Phylum: Arthropoda
- Class: Insecta
- Order: Lepidoptera
- Family: Crambidae
- Genus: Neurophyseta
- Species: N. durgalis

Binomial name
- Neurophyseta durgalis Schaus, 1920

Species of moth

Neurophyseta durgalis is a moth in the family Crambidae. It was described by William Schaus in 1920. It is found in Guatemala.

The wingspan is about 15 mm. The forewings are white with a marginal brown line interrupted by veins.
