= Ceracanthia soraella =

Scientific classification
- Domain: Eukaryota
- Kingdom: Animalia
- Phylum: Arthropoda
- Class: Insecta
- Order: Lepidoptera
- Family: Pyralidae
- Genus: Ceracanthia
- Species: C. soraella

Binomial name
- Ceracanthia soraella (Druce, 1899)

Synonyms
- Homoeosoma soraella Druce, 1899; Drescoma drucella Dyar, 1914; Drescomposis subelisa Dyar, 1919

Species of moth

Ceracanthia soraella is a species of snout moth. It was described by Druce in 1899, and is known from Mexico, Costa Rica, Guatemala, Panama, Belize, French Guiana, Ecuador, and Brazil.
