= Neurophyseta camptogrammalis =

Scientific classification
- Domain: Eukaryota
- Kingdom: Animalia
- Phylum: Arthropoda
- Class: Insecta
- Order: Lepidoptera
- Family: Crambidae
- Genus: Neurophyseta
- Species: N. camptogrammalis

Binomial name
- Neurophyseta camptogrammalis Hampson, 1912

Species of moth

Neurophyseta camptogrammalis is a moth in the family Crambidae. It was described by George Hampson in 1912. It is found in Guatemala.

The larvae feed on Alsophila firma.
