= Lipocosma teutonialis =

Scientific classification
- Domain: Eukaryota
- Kingdom: Animalia
- Phylum: Arthropoda
- Class: Insecta
- Order: Lepidoptera
- Family: Crambidae
- Genus: Lipocosma
- Species: L. teutonialis

Binomial name
- Lipocosma teutonialis Munroe, 1965

Species of moth

Lipocosma teutonialis is a moth in the family Crambidae. It is found in Brazil.
