= Glaphyria tanamoalis =

Scientific classification
- Kingdom: Animalia
- Phylum: Arthropoda
- Class: Insecta
- Order: Lepidoptera
- Family: Crambidae
- Genus: Glaphyria
- Species: G. tanamoalis

Binomial name
- Glaphyria tanamoalis (Schaus, 1920)

Synonyms
- Neurophyseta tanamoalis Schaus, 1920

Species of moth

Glaphyria tanamoalis is a moth in the family Crambidae. It was described by William Schaus in 1920. It is found in Cuba.

The wingspan is about 12 mm. The forewings are pale ochreous grey with white lines. The hindwings are white, the terminal half faintly suffused with ochreous grey.
