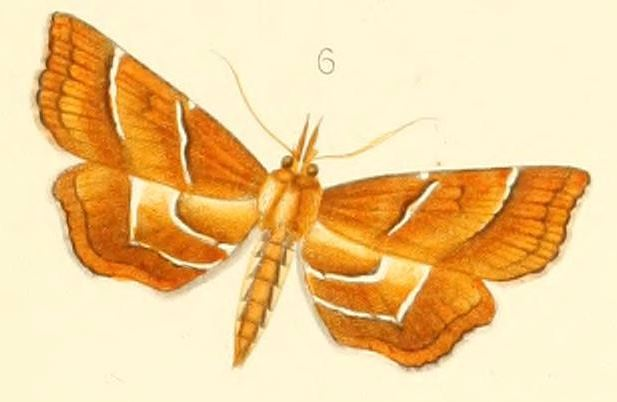

Scientific classification
- Kingdom: Animalia
- Phylum: Arthropoda
- Class: Insecta
- Order: Lepidoptera
- Family: Crambidae
- Genus: Neurophyseta
- Species: N. upupalis

Binomial name
- Neurophyseta upupalis (Guenée, 1862)

Synonyms
- Cymoriza upupalis Guenée, 1862

= Neurophyseta upupalis =

Species of moth

Neurophyseta upupalis is a moth of the family Crambidae. It is found on Réunion in the Indian Ocean. This moth is very rare; only three specimens had been found up to the last report in 2008.
