= Neurophyseta albicomma =

Scientific classification
- Domain: Eukaryota
- Kingdom: Animalia
- Phylum: Arthropoda
- Class: Insecta
- Order: Lepidoptera
- Family: Crambidae
- Genus: Neurophyseta
- Species: N. albicomma

Binomial name
- Neurophyseta albicomma (C. Swinhoe, 1894)

Synonyms
- Cymoriza albicomma C. Swinhoe, 1894

Species of moth

Neurophyseta albicomma is a moth in the family Crambidae. It was described by Charles Swinhoe in 1894. It is found in Meghalaya, India.
