= Neurophyseta damescalis =

Scientific classification
- Kingdom: Animalia
- Phylum: Arthropoda
- Class: Insecta
- Order: Lepidoptera
- Family: Crambidae
- Genus: Neurophyseta
- Species: N. damescalis

Binomial name
- Neurophyseta damescalis (Guenée, 1854)

Synonyms
- Ambia damescalis Guenée, 1854; Cymoriza bocusalis Walker, 1859

Species of moth

Neurophyseta damescalis is a moth in the family Crambidae. It was described by Achille Guenée in 1854. It is found in Brazil.
