= Neurophyseta mellograpta =

Scientific classification
- Kingdom: Animalia
- Phylum: Arthropoda
- Class: Insecta
- Order: Lepidoptera
- Family: Crambidae
- Genus: Neurophyseta
- Species: N. mellograpta

Binomial name
- Neurophyseta mellograpta Dyar, 1914

Species of moth

Neurophyseta mellograpta is a moth in the family Crambidae. It was described by Harrison Gray Dyar Jr. in 1914. It lives in Panama.
