= Neurophyseta volcanalis =

Scientific classification
- Domain: Eukaryota
- Kingdom: Animalia
- Phylum: Arthropoda
- Class: Insecta
- Order: Lepidoptera
- Family: Crambidae
- Genus: Neurophyseta
- Species: N. volcanalis

Binomial name
- Neurophyseta volcanalis Schaus, 1920

Species of moth

Neurophyseta volcanalis is a moth in the family Crambidae. It was described by William Schaus in 1920. It is found in Mexico.

The wingspan is about 12 mm. The forewings are white with fine brown lines.
