= Neurophyseta ustalis =

Scientific classification
- Kingdom: Animalia
- Phylum: Arthropoda
- Class: Insecta
- Order: Lepidoptera
- Family: Crambidae
- Genus: Neurophyseta
- Species: N. ustalis

Binomial name
- Neurophyseta ustalis (Walker, 1865)

Synonyms
- Cymoriza ustalis Walker, 1865

Species of moth

Neurophyseta ustalis is a moth in the family Crambidae. It was described by Francis Walker in 1865. It is found in India.
