= Neurophyseta virginalis =

Scientific classification
- Domain: Eukaryota
- Kingdom: Animalia
- Phylum: Arthropoda
- Class: Insecta
- Order: Lepidoptera
- Family: Crambidae
- Genus: Neurophyseta
- Species: N. virginalis

Binomial name
- Neurophyseta virginalis (Dognin, 1904)

Synonyms
- Omphaloptera virginalis Dognin, 1904

Species of moth

Neurophyseta virginalis is a moth in the family Crambidae. It was described by Paul Dognin in 1904. It is found in Ecuador.
