= Glaphyria citronalis =

Scientific classification
- Domain: Eukaryota
- Kingdom: Animalia
- Phylum: Arthropoda
- Class: Insecta
- Order: Lepidoptera
- Family: Crambidae
- Genus: Glaphyria
- Species: G. citronalis

Binomial name
- Glaphyria citronalis (H. Druce, 1899)

Synonyms
- Homophysa citronalis H. Druce, 1899

Species of moth

Glaphyria citronalis is a moth in the family Crambidae. It was described by Herbert Druce in 1899. It is found from south-eastern Mexico south to Central America and Brazil.

There are four transverse yellow apical streaks on the forewings.
