= Lipocosma albinibasalis =

Scientific classification
- Domain: Eukaryota
- Kingdom: Animalia
- Phylum: Arthropoda
- Class: Insecta
- Order: Lepidoptera
- Family: Crambidae
- Genus: Lipocosma
- Species: L. albinibasalis

Binomial name
- Lipocosma albinibasalis Munroe, 1995

Synonyms
- Lipocosma albibasalis Barnes & McDunnough, 1911 (preocc.)

Species of moth

Lipocosma albinibasalis is a moth in the family Crambidae. It is found in North America, where it has been recorded from Arizona, California and Baja California.

The length of the forewings is 7–8 mm. Adults are on wing from June to September.
