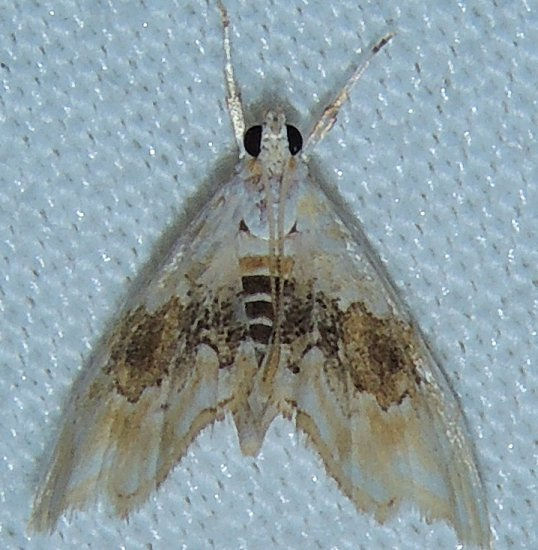

Scientific classification
- Kingdom: Animalia
- Phylum: Arthropoda
- Class: Insecta
- Order: Lepidoptera
- Family: Crambidae
- Genus: Lipocosma
- Species: L. sicalis

Binomial name
- Lipocosma sicalis (Walker, 1859)

Synonyms
- Leucinodes sicalis Walker, 1859; Pyralis perfusalis Walker, 1866

= Lipocosma sicalis =

Species of moth

Lipocosma sicalis is a moth in the family Crambidae. It was described by Francis Walker in 1859. It is found in North America, where it has been recorded from Alabama, Arkansas, Florida, Georgia, Illinois, Indiana, Kansas, Maryland, Massachusetts, Mississippi, Missouri, New Hampshire, North Carolina, Ohio, Oklahoma, Ontario, South Carolina, Tennessee, Texas and West Virginia.

The wingspan is about 15 mm. Adults are on wing from April to August.
