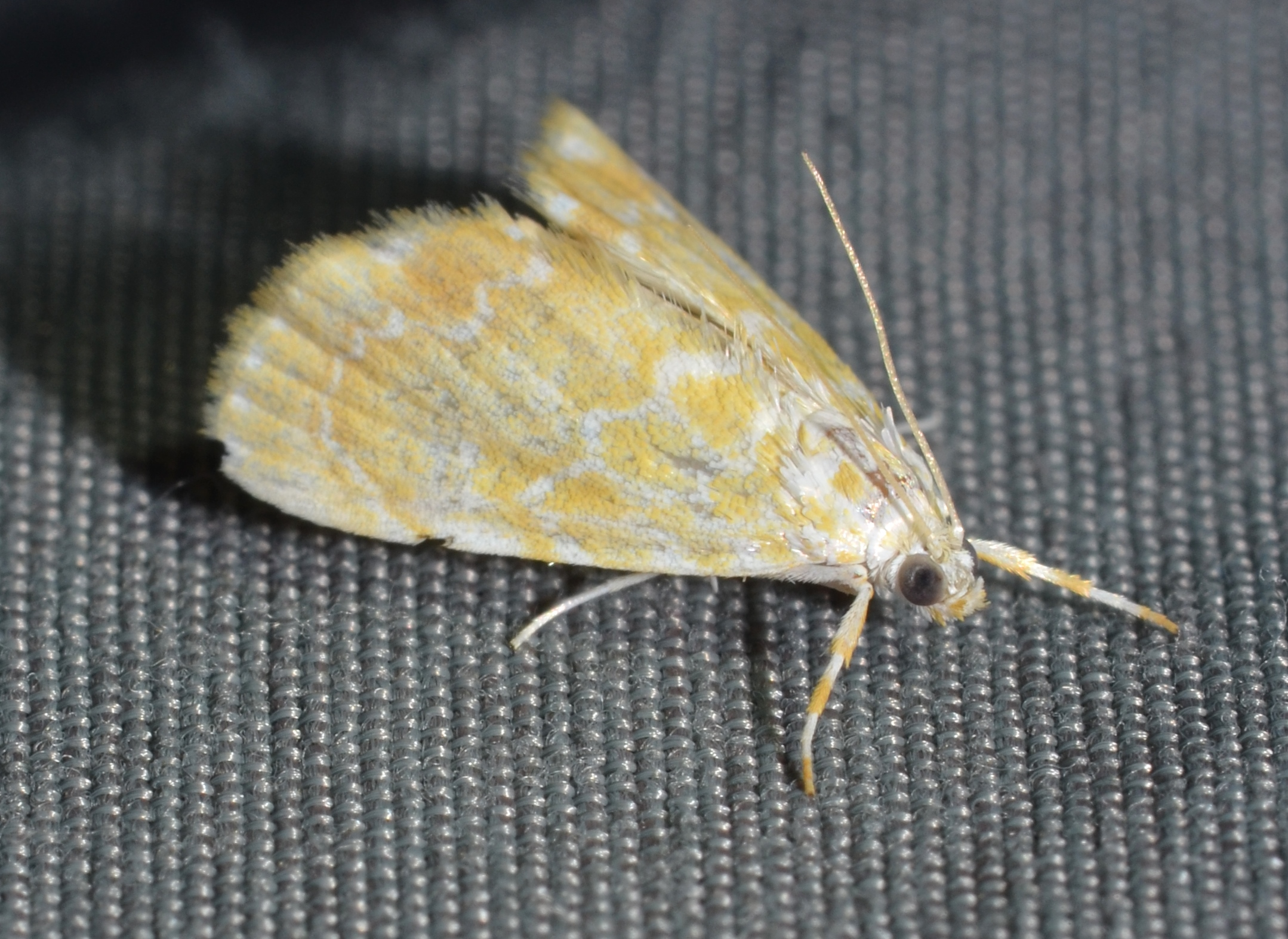

Scientific classification
- Kingdom: Animalia
- Phylum: Arthropoda
- Class: Insecta
- Order: Lepidoptera
- Family: Crambidae
- Genus: Glaphyria
- Species: G. glaphyralis

Binomial name
- Glaphyria glaphyralis (Guenée, 1854)

Synonyms
- Homophysa glaphyralis Guenée, 1854; Lipocosma albolineata Grote & Robinson, 1867; Scopula stipatalis Walker, 1866

= Glaphyria glaphyralis =

Species of moth

Glaphyria glaphyralis, the common glaphyria moth, is a moth in the family Crambidae. It was described by Achille Guenée in 1854. It is found in North America, where it has been recorded from Alabama, Arkansas, Florida, Georgia, Illinois, Indiana, Kentucky, Maryland, Massachusetts, Mississippi, Missouri, New Jersey, North Carolina, Ohio, Oklahoma, Ontario, Pennsylvania, South Carolina, Tennessee and West Virginia.
