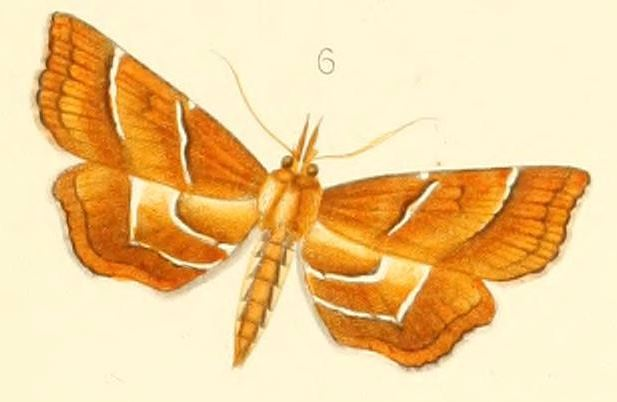
- Neurophyseta upupalis

Scientific classification
- Kingdom: Animalia
- Phylum: Arthropoda
- Clade: Pancrustacea
- Class: Insecta
- Order: Lepidoptera
- Family: Crambidae
- Subfamily: Musotiminae
- Genus: Neurophyseta; Hampson, 1895

Synonyms
- Cymoriza Guenée, 1854; Cymorrhiza E. Hering, 1903; Neurophysetis Hampson, 1895; Omphaloptera Hampson, 1897

= Neurophyseta =

Genus of moths

Neurophyseta is a genus of moths of the family Crambidae.

== Species ==
- Neurophyseta aetalis Walker, 1859
- Neurophyseta albicomma (Swinhoe, 1894)
- Neurophyseta albimarginalis Schaus, 1920
- Neurophyseta albinalis Hampson, 1912
- Neurophyseta albirufa Hampson, 1912
- Neurophyseta arcigrammalis Hampson, 1912
- Neurophyseta arcuatalis Hampson, 1912
- Neurophyseta argyroleuca Hampson, 1912
- Neurophyseta auralis Hampson, 1912
- Neurophyseta avertinalis
- Neurophyseta bolusalis
- Neurophyseta camptogrammalis Hampson, 1912
- Neurophyseta clymenalis (Walker, 1859)
- Neurophyseta comoralis (Strand, 1916)
- Neurophyseta completalis
- Neurophyseta conantia Phillips & Solis, 1996
- Neurophyseta cyclicalis Schaus, 1913
- Neurophyseta dabiusalis
- Neurophyseta damescalis Guenée, 1854
- Neurophyseta debalis
- Neurophyseta diplogrammalis Hampson, 1912
- Neurophyseta disciatralis
- Neurophyseta durgalis Schaus, 1920
- Neurophyseta flavirufalis
- Neurophyseta fulvalis Hampson, 1912
- Neurophyseta fulvistrigalis
- Neurophyseta graphicalis
- Neurophyseta hoenei (Caradja in Caradja & Meyrick, 1934)
- Neurophyseta interruptalis (Wileman & South, 1917)
- Neurophyseta irrectalis (Guenée, 1854)
- Neurophyseta jessica Phillips & Solis, 1996
- Neurophyseta laothoealis (Walker, 1859)
- Neurophyseta laudamialis
- Neurophyseta marin Phillips & Solis, 1996
- Neurophyseta mellograpta
- Neurophyseta mesophaealis
- Neurophyseta mineolalis (Schaus, 1940)
- Neurophyseta mollitalis (Schaus, 1912)
- Neurophyseta narcissusalis (Walker, 1859)
- Neurophyseta normalis Hampson, 1912
- Neurophyseta paroalis
- Neurophyseta perlalis
- Neurophyseta perrivalis Hampson, 1912
- Neurophyseta phaeozonalis (Hampson, 1906)
- Neurophyseta pomperialis
- Neurophyseta purifactalis
- Neurophyseta randalis (Druce, 1896)
- Neurophyseta renata Phillips & Solis, 1996
- Neurophyseta rufalis Hampson, 1912
- Neurophyseta saniralis (Viette, 1989)
- Neurophyseta sittenfelda Phillips & Solis, 1996
- Neurophyseta sogalalis (Viette, 1989)
- Neurophyseta stigmatalis
- Neurophyseta taiwanalis (Shibuya, 1928)
- Neurophyseta turrialbalis Schaus, 1912
- Neurophyseta upupalis (Guenée, 1862)
- Neurophyseta ursmaralis Schaus, 1927
- Neurophyseta ustalis (Walker, 1865)
- Neurophyseta villarda Phillips & Solis, 1996
- Neurophyseta virginalis
- Neurophyseta volcanalis Schaus, 1920
- Neurophyseta zobeida Phillips & Solis, 1996

== Former species ==
- Neurophyseta dasymalis
- Neurophyseta fulvilinealis
- Neurophyseta subpuralis
