= Neurophyseta normalis =

Scientific classification
- Kingdom: Animalia
- Phylum: Arthropoda
- Class: Insecta
- Order: Lepidoptera
- Family: Crambidae
- Genus: Neurophyseta
- Species: N. normalis

Binomial name
- Neurophyseta normalis Hampson, 1912

Species of moth

Neurophyseta normalis is a moth in the family Crambidae. It was described by George Hampson in 1912. It is found in the West Indies, including St. Vincent and Cuba.
