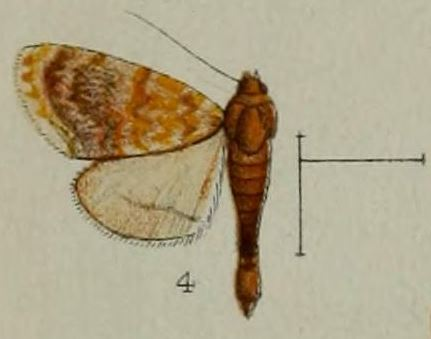

Scientific classification
- Kingdom: Animalia
- Phylum: Arthropoda
- Class: Insecta
- Order: Lepidoptera
- Family: Crambidae
- Genus: Glaphyria
- Species: G. polycyma

Binomial name
- Glaphyria polycyma (Hampson, 1898)

Synonyms
- Homophysa polycyma Hampson, 1898; Homophysa atmocharis Meyrick, 1935; Glaphyria atmocharis

= Glaphyria polycyma =

Species of moth

Glaphyria polycyma is a moth in the family Crambidae. It is found in Brazil and Argentina.
