= Roger Conant (herpetologist) =

American herpetologist

Roger Conant (May 6, 1909 – December 19, 2003) was an American herpetologist, author, educator and conservationist. He was Director Emeritus of the Philadelphia Zoo and adjunct professor at the University of New Mexico. He wrote one of the first comprehensive field guides for North American reptiles in 1958 entitled: A Field Guide to Reptiles and Amphibians of Eastern and Central North America, in the Peterson Field Guide series.

== Biography ==
Born in Mamaroneck, New York, Conant lost his father when he was young. When he was a teenager he took a job at a local zoo to help his mother make ends meet, which, along with participating in the Boy Scouts of America, began his lifelong passion for reptiles. He was the first Eagle Scout in Monmouth County Council, New Jersey in 1924. He moved to Toledo, Ohio in 1929 and worked as Curator of Reptiles, and later General Curator at the Toledo Zoo from 1929 to 1935. In 1935 he returned to Philadelphia and became the Curator of Reptiles at the Philadelphia Zoo. He was president of the American Association of Zoological Parks and Aquariums from 1946 to 1947 and helped found the Philadelphia Herpetological Society in 1952. He held many positions in the American Society of Ichthyologists and Herpetologists, including president in 1962; he advocated keeping the organization unified rather than splitting into separate organizations for herpetology and ichthyology. He was promoted to Director of the Philadelphia Zoo in 1967. He retired from the zoo in 1973 and moved to Albuquerque, New Mexico where he became a professor at the University of New Mexico. He continued to do research and writing. Over his career he wrote some 240 scientific papers, and 12 books. He died of cancer in Albuquerque on December 19, 2003. A significant bequest from his estate helped put the Chihuahuan Desert Research Institute on a solid financial footing.

Roger Conant is credited with describing numerous new species of snakes, including several species of water snakes (of the genus Nerodia) as well as several species of garter snakes (of the genus Thamnophis). He collaborated with Howard K. Gloyd, and finished Gloyd's monograph on snakes of the genus Agkistrodon after Gloyd's death in 1978.

Roger Conant was a descendant of Roger Conant, leader of the Salem, Massachusetts village (and later Massachusetts Bay Company).

== Taxa named in honor of Conant ==
The moth Neurophyseta conantia is named after Conant.

Conant is commemorated in the scientific names of two snakes: Thamnophis conanti, a species of garter snake; and Agkistrodon conanti, a species of venomous pit viper.

== Selected bibliography ==
- Reptile Study Guide (1927); Boy Scouts of America, Irving TX
- What Snake Is That? A Field Guide to the Snakes of the United States East of the Rocky Mountains (1939); additional author: William Bridges, and illustrator: Edmond Malnate; New York and London: D. Appleton-Century Company
- A Field Guide to Reptiles and Amphibians of Eastern and Central North America (1958); Illustrated by Isabelle Hunt Conant (Series: Peterson Field Guides); Boston: Houghton Mifflin Company
  - Second edition (1975), ISBN 0-395-19979-4 (hardcover), ISBN 0-395-19977-8 (paperback)
  - Third edition (1991), additional author: Joseph T. Collins, and illustrator: Tom R. Johnson
  - Third edition, expanded (1998); ISBN 0-395-90452-8
  - Fourth edition (2016), additional author: Robert Powell, ISBN 978-0-544-12997-9
- Snakes of the Agkistrodon Complex: A Monographic Review (with Howard K. Gloyd) (1990), SSAR Publications, ISBN 0-916984-20-6
- Autobiography: A Field Guide to the Life and Times of Roger Conant, (1997), Canyonlands Publishing Group, ISBN 0-9657446-0-4
- The Reptiles of Virginia (1997), Smithsonian Books, ISBN 1-56098-754-5
- Reptiles and Amphibians (Peterson First Guides) (1999), Houghton Mifflin Company, (1999): ISBN 0-395-97195-0
- North American Watersnakes: A Natural History (2004), University of Oklahoma Press, ISBN 0-8061-3599-9
- Reptile Study (1944); Merit Badge Series No. 3813, Boy Scouts of America, Brunswick, New Jersey, 62 pp.; photographs by Mark Mooney, Jr. and Isabelle Hunt Conant
