= Lipocosma nigripictalis =

Scientific classification
- Kingdom: Animalia
- Phylum: Arthropoda
- Class: Insecta
- Order: Lepidoptera
- Family: Crambidae
- Genus: Lipocosma
- Species: L. nigripictalis

Binomial name
- Lipocosma nigripictalis Hampson, 1898

Species of moth

Lipocosma nigripictalis is a moth in the family Crambidae. It is found from southern Mexico south to Brazil.
