= Neurophyseta completalis =

Scientific classification
- Domain: Eukaryota
- Kingdom: Animalia
- Phylum: Arthropoda
- Class: Insecta
- Order: Lepidoptera
- Family: Crambidae
- Genus: Neurophyseta
- Species: N. completalis

Binomial name
- Neurophyseta completalis (Dognin, 1904)

Synonyms
- Omphaloptera completalis Dognin, 1904

Species of moth

Neurophyseta completalis is a moth in the family Crambidae. It is found in Peru.
