= Glaphyria micralis =

Scientific classification
- Kingdom: Animalia
- Phylum: Arthropoda
- Class: Insecta
- Order: Lepidoptera
- Family: Crambidae
- Genus: Glaphyria
- Species: G. micralis

Binomial name
- Glaphyria micralis (Guenée, 1854)

Synonyms
- Homophysa micralis Guenée, 1854

Species of moth

Glaphyria micralis is a moth in the family Crambidae. It is found in Brazil.
