= Lipocosma grimbaldalis =

Scientific classification
- Domain: Eukaryota
- Kingdom: Animalia
- Phylum: Arthropoda
- Class: Insecta
- Order: Lepidoptera
- Family: Crambidae
- Genus: Lipocosma
- Species: L. grimbaldalis

Binomial name
- Lipocosma grimbaldalis (Schaus, 1924)

Synonyms
- Aulacodes grimbaldalis Schaus, 1924

Species of moth

Lipocosma grimbaldalis is a moth in the family Crambidae described by William Schaus in 1924. It is found in Guatemala.

The wingspan is about 11 mm. The forewings are cinnamon buff with whitish basal and antemedial fascia and slightly darker medial and postmedial lines. The base of the hindwings is silvery white, crossed by an antemedial cinnamon-buff shade from the cell to the inner margin. This shade is connected with the medial line by a similar narrow shade. The medial line is edged with white distally and the space beyond it is cinnamon buff.
