= Glaphyria amazonica =

Scientific classification
- Domain: Eukaryota
- Kingdom: Animalia
- Phylum: Arthropoda
- Class: Insecta
- Order: Lepidoptera
- Family: Crambidae
- Genus: Glaphyria
- Species: G. amazonica

Binomial name
- Glaphyria amazonica (Munroe, 1964)

Synonyms
- Scybalista amazonica Munroe, 1964

Species of moth

Glaphyria amazonica is a moth in the family Crambidae. It is found in Brazil.
