= Capparis mollicella =

Conservation status
- Vulnerable (IUCN 2.3)

Scientific classification
- Kingdom: Plantae
- Clade: Embryophytes
- Clade: Tracheophytes
- Clade: Spermatophytes
- Clade: Angiosperms
- Clade: Eudicots
- Clade: Rosids
- Order: Brassicales
- Family: Capparaceae
- Genus: Capparis
- Species: C. mollicella

Binomial name
- Capparis mollicella Standley

Species of flowering plant

Capparis mollicella is a species of plant in the Capparaceae family. It is endemic to Mexico and Costa Rica.
