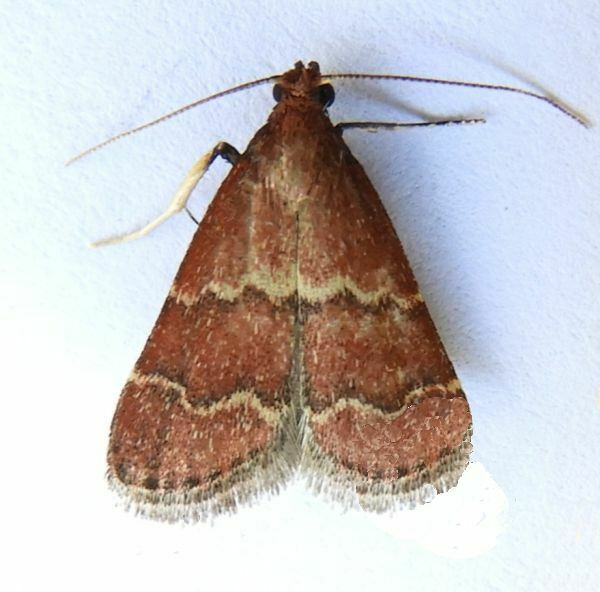

Scientific classification
- Domain: Eukaryota
- Kingdom: Animalia
- Phylum: Arthropoda
- Class: Insecta
- Order: Lepidoptera
- Family: Pyralidae
- Genus: Heliades
- Species: H. huachucalis

Binomial name
- Heliades huachucalis (Haimbach, 1915)

Synonyms
- Pyrausta huachucalis Haimbach, 1915

= Heliades huachucalis =

Species of moth

Heliades huachucalis is a species of moth of the family Pyralidae. It is found in Arizona (the Huachuca Mountains).
