= Maria Alma Solis =

American entomologist

- Born: February 9, 1956 (age 70)

Maria Alma Solis is an entomologist at the Systematic Entomology Laboratory (SEL) of the Agricultural Research Service of the U.S. Department of Agriculture.

== Early life ==
Maria Alma Solis was born on February 9, 1956, in Corpus Christi, Texas, and raised in Brownsville, Texas. She graduated from Brownsville High School in 1974. Solis began her studies at Texas Southmost College, then transferred to the University of Texas at Austin and majored in science education. She earned her master's degree in biological sciences with Larry Gilbert at UT Austin and her PhD in insect systematics at the Department of Entomology with Charles Mitter at University of Maryland at College Park.

== Career ==
She began her career with the Agricultural Research Service Systematic Entomology Laboratory as a research scientist in 1986. After completing her PhD in 1989, Solis was promoted to research entomologist with emphasis in snout moths, and after serving as acting research leader of SEL in 2003, became a permanent research leader in 2005. She returned to full-time research in 2014.

In 1999, Solis served as associate dean of the College of Math, Science, and Technology on a year-long detail to the University of Texas at Brownsville. She also served as the acting associate director for the ARS Beltsville Agricultural Research Center for a brief time in 2011. Solis is an expert in snout moths with more than 100 publications and has worked to upgrade the Pyraloidea collection at the National Museum of Natural History to 20th-century standards. The Museum of Natural History houses the largest collection in the world. She is a long time member of the Lepidopterists' Society, and served on the executive committee from 1995 to 1997. She was the first woman president of the Washington Biologists' Field Club.

== Awards and honors ==
Maria Alma Solis was elected a fellow of the Entomological Society of America in 2018. In 1991, she received a Certificate of Merit from the U.S. Department of Agriculture for outstanding performance. While conducting fieldwork in Northern Mexico she assisted with development of an organismal program for the South Texas Engineering, Math, and Science program for high school students funded by National Aeronautical Space Administration in collaboration with the Gorgas Science Foundation.
