= List of reptiles of Pennsylvania =

This is a list of reptiles of Pennsylvania as listed by the Pennsylvania Fish and Boat Commission. As of 2024, there are 38 native reptiles in Pennsylvania. The species are listed as in the PFBC list, with the exception of introduced species, which are derived from other sources. Notes on ranges provided by Pennsylvania Amphibian & Reptile Survey.

== Testudines - turtles and tortoises ==
Family: Chelydridae - snapping turtles

Image	Common name	Scientific name	Status	Notes	Distribution
	Common snapping turtle	Chelydra serpentina (Linnaeus, 1758)	Abundant		Statewide

Family: Emydidae - pond turtles

Image	Common name	Scientific name	Status	Notes	Distribution
	Midland painted turtle	Chrysemys picta marginata Agassiz, 1857	Abundant	Subspecies of widespread painted turtle	Statewide, but primarily west of the Appalachians
	Eastern painted turtle	Chrysemys picta picta (Schneider, 1783)	Abundant	Subspecies of widespread painted turtle	Primarily east of the Appalachians
	Spotted turtle	Clemmys guttata (Schneider, 1792)	Species of special concern		Much of the west, as well as some of the counties in the northwest and Westmoreland County in the southwest
	Wood turtle	Glyptemys insculpta (Le Conte, 1830)	Species of special concern		Statewide, but rarer to the west
	Bog turtle	Glyptemys muhlenbergii (Schoepff, 1801)	Endangered		Southeastern counties (Note: The population in Crawford County and Mercer County has not been recorded since 1928.)
	Blanding's turtle	Emydoidea blandingii (Holbrook, 1838)	Candidate species		Erie County
	Northern map turtle	Graptemys geographica (Lesueur, 1817)	Abundant		Statewide, except in Allegheny National Forest and northern central counties
	False map turtle	Graptemys pseudogeographica pseudogeographica (Gray, 1831)	Not evaluated	Several observations on the citizen science website iNaturalist, also a 1911 record in the University of Colorado Museum of Natural History	Primarily around the Delaware River, also seen near Pittsburgh
	Northern diamondback terrapin	Malaclemys terrapin terrapin Schoepff, 1793	Incidental	Nominate subspecies	Rarely strays into southeast through Delaware River
	River cooter	Pseudemys concinna (Le Conte, 1830)	Nonnative	Introduced from pet trade	Primarily southeast, some southwest records
	Northern red-bellied cooter	Pseudemys rubriventris (Le Conte, 1830)	Threatened		Southeastern counties
	Eastern box turtle	Terrapene carolina carolina (Linnaeus, 1758)	Species of special concern	Nominate subspecies	Statewide but more abundant to the south
	Red-eared slider	Trachemys scripta elegans (Wied-Neuwied, 1839)	Invasive	Listed as one of the world's worst invasive alien species	Statewide except northern central counties
	Yellow-bellied slider	Trachemys scripta scripta (Thunberg, 1792)	Invasive	Nominate subspecies of pond slider	Primarily southeast, but scattered observations throughout southern and central parts of the state

Family: Kinosternidae - mud and musk turtles

Image	Common name	Scientific name	Status	Notes	Distribution
	Southeastern mud turtle	Kinosternon subrubrum subrubrum Bonnaterre, 1789	Endangered	Nominate subspecies	Bucks County (Note: A single deceased mud turtle was recorded from Washington County.)
	Eastern musk turtle	Sternotherus odoratus (Latreille, 1802)	Abundant		Primarily in the northwestern and southeastern counties, some scattered records in central, northwestern, and southeastern counties

Family: Trionychidae - softshell turtles

Image	Common name	Scientific name	Status	Notes	Distribution
	Midland smooth softshell turtle	Apalone mutica mutica (Lesueur, 1827)	Extirpated	Nominate subspecies	Formerly found in southwest, now extirpated
	Eastern spiny softshell	Apalone spinifera spinifera (Lesueur, 1827)	Abundant	Nominate subspecies	Eastern counties, Delaware River and its tributaries, scattered records in between

== Squamata - snakes and lizards ==
Order: Squamata

Clade: Sauria/Lacertilia - lizards

Family: Gekkonidae - geckos

Image	Common name	Scientific name	Status	Notes	Distribution
	Mediterranean house gecko	Hemidactylus turcicus (Linnaeus, 1758)	Nonnative		Southeastern counties

Family: Lacertidae - wall lizards

Image	Common name	Scientific name	Status	Notes	Distribution
	Northern Italian wall lizard	Podarcis siculus campestris (Rafinesque, 1810)	Nonnative		Philadelphia County, Montgomery County, and Bucks County

Family: Phrynosomatidae - earless, spiny, tree, side-blotched and horned lizards

Image	Common name	Scientific name	Status	Notes	Distribution
	Eastern fence lizard	Sceloporus undulatus (Bosc & Daudin, 1801)	Species of special concern		Southern and central counties

Family: Scincidae - skinks

Image	Common name	Scientific name	Status	Notes	Distribution
	Northern coal skink	Plestiodon anthracinus anthracinus Baird, 1850	Species of special concern	Nominate subspecies	Northern and central counties
	Common five-lined skink	Plestiodon fasciatus (Linnaeus, 1758)	Abundant		Essentially statewide, but more common in the northwest, central, and southeast
	Broad-headed skink	Plestiodon laticeps (Schneider, 1801)	Candidate species		Adams County, Lancaster County, and Chester County

Clade: Serpentes - snakes

Family: Colubridae - colubrid snakes

Image	Common name	Scientific name	Status	Notes	Distribution
	Eastern worm snake	Carphophis amoenus amoenus (Say, 1825)	Species of special concern		South-central and southeastern counties
	Kirtland's snake	Clonophis kirtlandii (Kennicott, 1856)	Endangered		Butler County, Allegheny County, and Forest County
	Northern black racer	Coluber constrictor constrictor Linnaeus, 1758	Abundant	Nominate subspecies	Statewide except northernmost counties
	Northern ring-necked snake	Diadophis punctatus edwardsii (Merrem, 1820)	Abundant	Subspecies of widespread ring-necked snake	Statewide
	Central ratsnake	Pantherophis alleghaniensis (Holbrook, 1836)	Abundant	The taxonomy of the genus Pantherophis, and especially P. alleghaniensis and P. quadrivittatus, are in flux, and the names and validity of this species are prone to change	Statewide
	Eastern hog-nosed snake	Heterodon platirhinos Latreille, 1801	Species of special concern		Central and eastern counties
	Eastern milksnake	Lampropeltis triangulum (Lacépède, 1789)	Abundant	When subspecies are recognized, the Pennsylvania subspecies is Lampropeltis triangulum triangulum	Statewide
	Northern watersnake	Nerodia sipedon sipedon (Linnaeus, 1758)	Abundant		Statewide
	Northern rough green snake	Opheodrys aestivus aestivus (Linnaeus, 1766)	Endangered		Lancaster County and Chester County
	Smooth green snake	Opheodrys vernalis (Harlan, 1827)	Species of special concern		Statewide except southeast
	Queensnake	Regina septemvittata (Say, 1825)	Species of special concern		Western and southeastern counties
	DeKay's brown snake	Storeria dekayi (Holbrook, 1836)	Abundant		Statewide
	Northern red-bellied snake	Storeria occipitomaculata occipitomaculata (Storer, 1839)	Abundant	Nominate subspecies	Statewide except southeast
	Short-headed garter snake	Thamnophis brachystoma (Cope, 1892)	Species of special concern		Northwestern counties, introduced to Pittsburgh area
	Eastern ribbonsnake	Thamnophis saurita saurita (Linnaeus, 1766)	Species of special concern	Subspecies of common ribbon snake	Central counties eastward, some records north of Pittsburgh
	Northern ribbon snake	Thamnophis saurita septentrionalis Rossman, 1963	Species of special concern	Subspecies of common ribbon snake	Northwestern counties and Tioga County
	Eastern garter snake	Thamnophis sirtalis sirtalis (Linnaeus, 1758)	Abundant	Nominate subspecies	Statewide
	Eastern smooth earth snake	Virginia valeriae valeriae Baird and Girard, 1853	Species of special concern	Subspecies of smooth earth snake	Lancaster County and Chester County
	Mountain earth snake	Virginia valeriae pulchra (Richmond, 1954)	Species of special concern	Subspecies of smooth earth snake	Central counties

Family: Viperidae - pit vipers

Image	Common name	Scientific name	Status	Notes	Distribution
	Eastern copperhead	Agkistrodon contortrix (Linnaeus, 1766)	Species of special concern		Most of state except westernmost and northernmost counties
	Timber rattlesnake	Crotalus horridus Linnaeus, 1758	Species of special concern		Most of state except western and southeastern counties
	Eastern massasauga	Sistrurus catenatus (Rafinesque, 1818)	Endangered		Venango County and Butler County

== Nonestablished species ==
Reptiles released from the pet trade can be seen in Pennsylvania. Some more established than others. Released pets can eventually become established breeding populations, such as in the case of the red-eared slider, which is now illegal to own in many countries.

- Testudines
  - Three-toed box turtle (Terrapene triunguis) - seen near Philadelphia and Allentown
  - Ornate box turtle (Terrapene ornata) - two records of escaped pets from southeast Pennsylvania
  - Chinese softshell turtle - an adult was found in the Delaware River. This species is present in New York City and has potential to become an invasive species.
  - Florida red-bellied cooter (Pseudemys nelsoni) - recorded by PARS in Chester County
- Sauria
  - Asian house gecko (Hemidactylus frenatus) - recorded in Franklin County by PARS
  - Tropical house gecko (Hemidactylus mabouia) - has a handful of singular records in the central and southeastern parts of the state
  - Brown anole (Anolis sagrei) - primarily around urban areas, notably Pittsburgh, Philadelphia, and Lancaster
  - Green anole (Anolis carolinensis) - around Pittsburgh and Philadelphia
- Serpentes
  - Corn snake (Pantherophis guttatus) - escapee observed north of Pittsburgh and in Philadelphia
