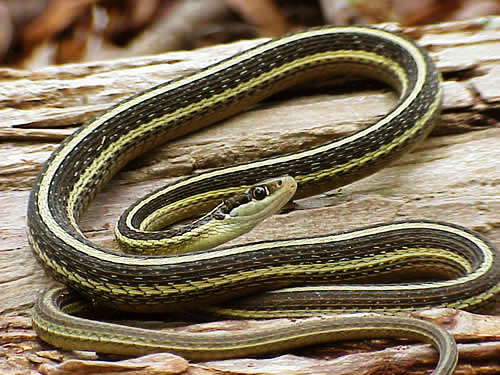
- Photo of an eastern ribbon snake

Scientific classification
- Kingdom: Animalia
- Phylum: Chordata
- Class: Reptilia
- Order: Squamata
- Suborder: Serpentes
- Family: Colubridae
- Genus: Thamnophis
- Species: T. saurita
- Subspecies: T. s. saurita

Trinomial name
- Thamnophis saurita saurita (Linnaeus, 1766)

= Thamnophis saurita saurita =

Eastern ribbon snake

Subspecies of snake

Thamnophis saurita saurita, the eastern ribbon snake or common ribbon snake, is one of four subspecies of the ribbon snake found in the southeastern United States.

Some similar species are the western ribbon snake, common garter snake, plains garter snake, and Butler's garter snake.

The other three subspecies are the northern (T. s. septentrionalis), southern (T. s. sackenii), and bluestripe (T. s. nitae) ribbon snakes.

== Description ==
The eastern ribbon snake gets its name from its very thin body. At maturity, it grows to between 18 and 86 centimetres (7.1 and 33.9 in) in length. It is a slender, black snake with a yellow mid-back stripe and one on each side. A brown stripe of one or two rows of scales extends onto the sides of the belly. The rest of the belly is a greenish-white color. It also has two rows of black spots between the back and side stripes. It also has a long tail that is about one-third of the length of its body. The labial scales around the mouth of the snake are unmarked and uniformly bright yellow or white. A white or light yellow bar borders the front of the eyes. Juveniles are colored like adults. Some aspects of the eastern ribbon snake make it different from a close relative, the common garter snake. The eastern ribbon snake has a much thinner body than a common garter snake, its tail makes up about one-third of its body length, it has stripes on the third and fourth scale rows and it has pure white lips, and a mark of white color in front of its eyes. It is not venomous.

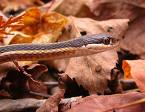

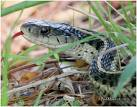

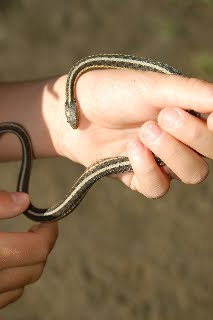

== Habitats ==
The common ribbon snake is typically found in the southeastern United States, usually in wetlands and near the edges of ponds and streams. Eastern ribbonsnakes prefer areas with open canopies and abundant herbaceous cover. They are found both in and out of water; they are adapted to both environments. When they are frightened, they take to the water or bushes. They do not dive like water snakes; they glide across the surface of the water instead. Eastern ribbonsnakes can be found in areas with low levels of urbanization but generally prefer more natural habitats.

== Diet ==
The ribbon snake generally eats small fish, tadpoles, salamanders, small frogs and toads, and occasionally insects. In some cases, the female has been observed eating her young. The typical time for snakes to hunt is in the morning or early evening. Once the snake has spotted its prey, it will quickly slither to catch its prey and swallow it whole. Eastern ribbonsnakes rely heavily on prey in open, sunlit shallows rather than deeper or shaded wetlands.

== Reproduction ==
Reproduction in eastern ribbon snakes takes place after they emerge from hibernation in the spring, in April or May. Mating occasionally takes place in the fall, but the female will delay fertilization and development until the next spring. The average gestation period is three months. The average number of young is around 12 but can range four to 27. Females give birth in late summer or the early fall. After birth, no parental care is involved; the young are left to fend for themselves. Most young reach sexual maturity after two years, but most usually wait until the third year.

== Behavior ==
Thamnophis saurita saurita are diurnal, visually oriented foragers that remain active year around. However, in colder months, the snake may be forced to hibernate, typically in ant mounds, mole tunnels, crayfish burrows, muskrat lodges, and bank burrows. During winter dormancy, individuals commonly overwinter in these communal hibernacula alongside other snake species. Ribbon snakes rarely bite when handled, but they do produce a foul musk from their anal glands when they feel threatened.
