= Ribbon snake =

Ribbon snake may refer to:

- Thamnophis saurita, also known as the eastern or common ribbon snake
- Thamnophis proximus, also known as the western ribbon snake
