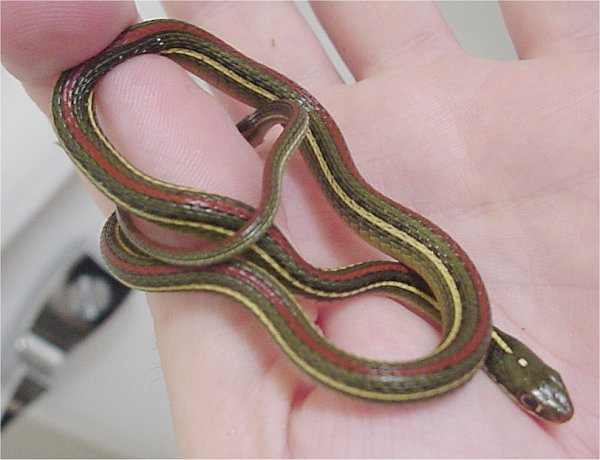

Scientific classification
- Domain: Eukaryota
- Kingdom: Animalia
- Phylum: Chordata
- Class: Reptilia
- Order: Squamata
- Suborder: Serpentes
- Family: Colubridae
- Genus: Thamnophis
- Species: T. proximus
- Subspecies: T. p. rubrilineatus

Trinomial name
- Thamnophis proximus rubrilineatus Rossman, 1963

= Thamnophis proximus rubrilineatus =

Subspecies of snake

Thamnophis proximus rubrilineatus, the redstripe ribbon snake, is a subspecies of the western ribbon snake, a garter snake endemic to the southern United States.

== Geographic range ==
It is found in West Texas on the Edwards Plateau.

== Description ==
This species has a distinctive red stripe down the center of the back, to which both the common name and the subspecific name refer.

== Habitat and behavior ==
It is semiaquatic, spending most of its time on the edge of permanent bodies of water such as swamps, ponds, lakes, or slow-moving streams. It is fast-moving and an excellent swimmer.

== Diet ==
Its primary diet is amphibians, such as the northern cricket frog (Acris crepitans), but it will also consume lizards and small rodents.
