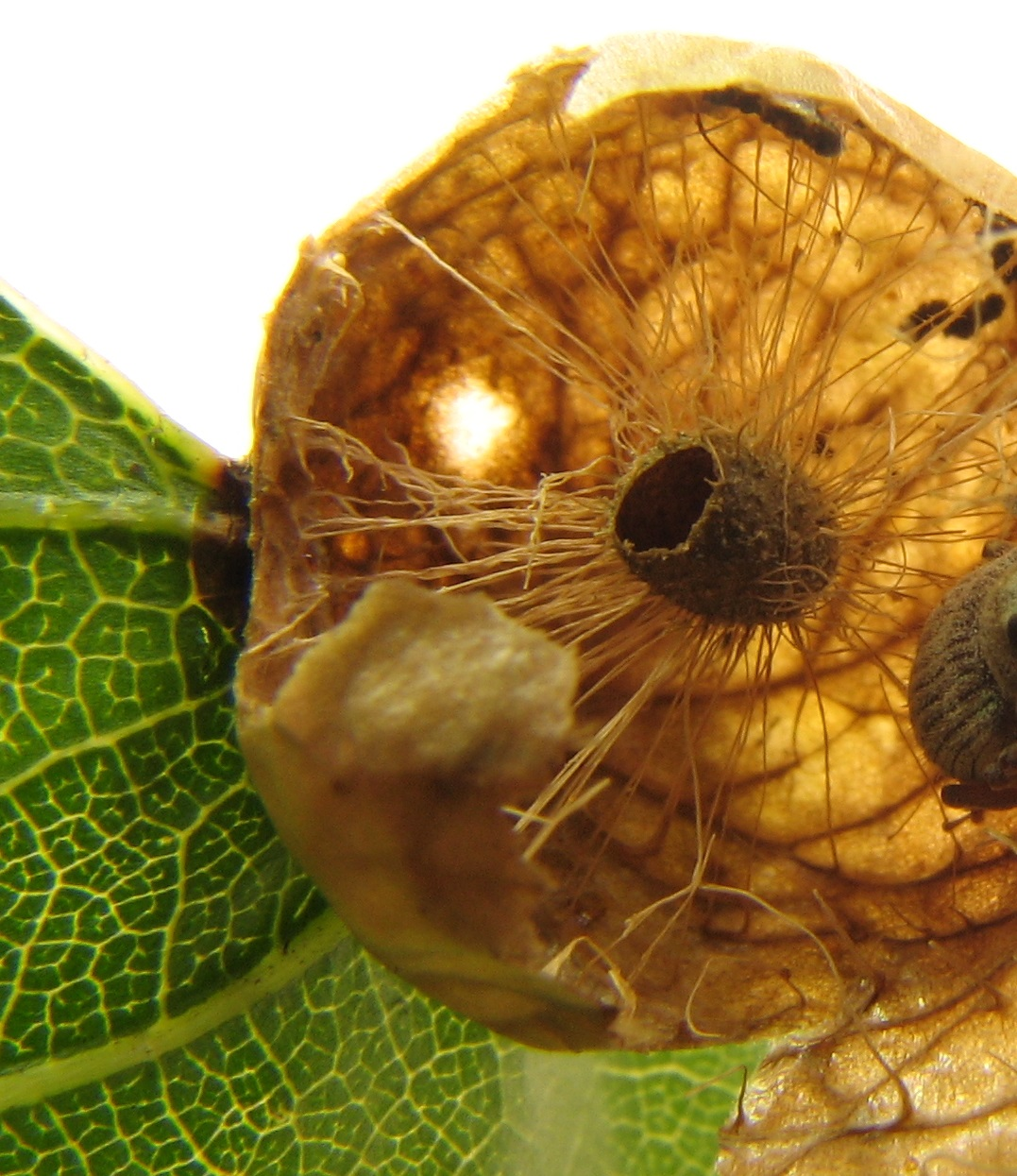
- Gall made by Amphibolips quercusinanis on oak leaf

Scientific classification
- Kingdom: Animalia
- Phylum: Arthropoda
- Class: Insecta
- Order: Hymenoptera
- Family: Cynipidae
- Genus: Amphibolips
- Species: A. quercusinanis

Binomial name
- Amphibolips quercusinanis Osten-Sacken, 1862

= Amphibolips quercusinanis =

Species of wasp

Amphibolips quercusinanis, known generally as the larger empty oak apple wasp, is a species of gall wasp in the family Cynipidae.

== Ecology ==
Range is central and eastern North America. Larvae induce galls on the leaves of host red oaks, including Quercus coccinea and Quercus rubra. Gall formation occurs on host leaf buds in the spring.

Galls are apple-sized, up to 2" in diameter, with a bumpy, hairless, spotted texture. Internally, the larva resides in a central chamber with radiating white fibers called nutritive tissue which feed the larva with nutrients supplied by the host. As the gall matures its external color changes from green to brown. After the adult wasp emerges, the gall becomes brittle and "empty" when the nutritive fibers disintegrate.

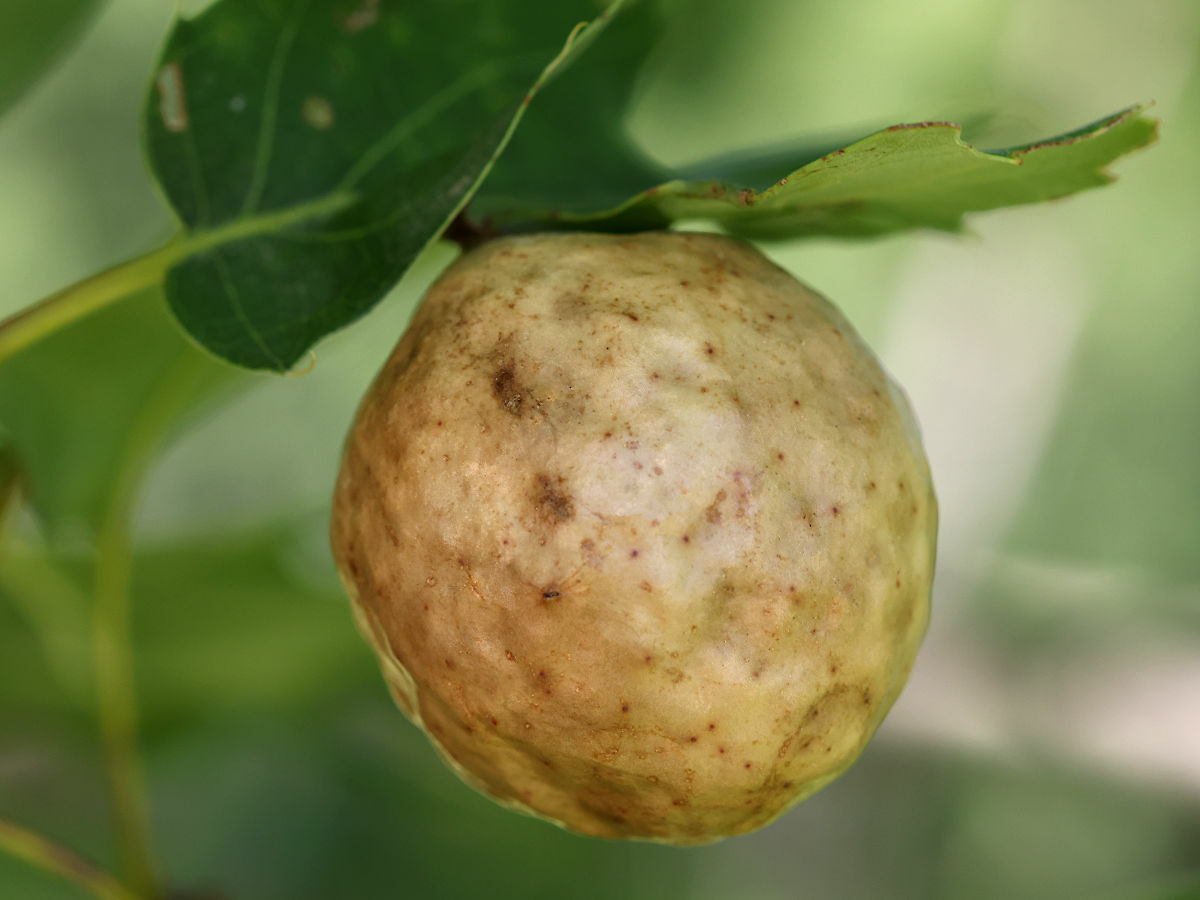
external mature gall

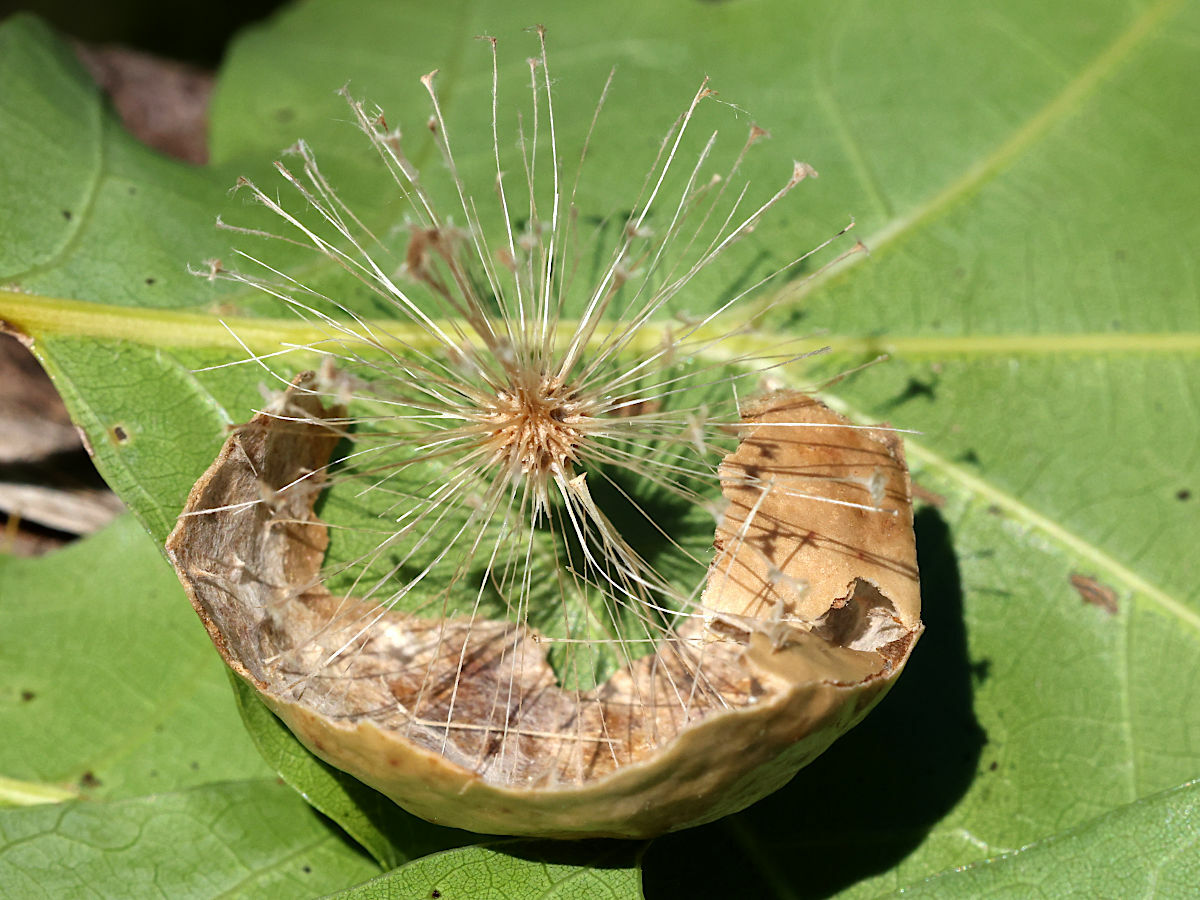
internal empty gall
