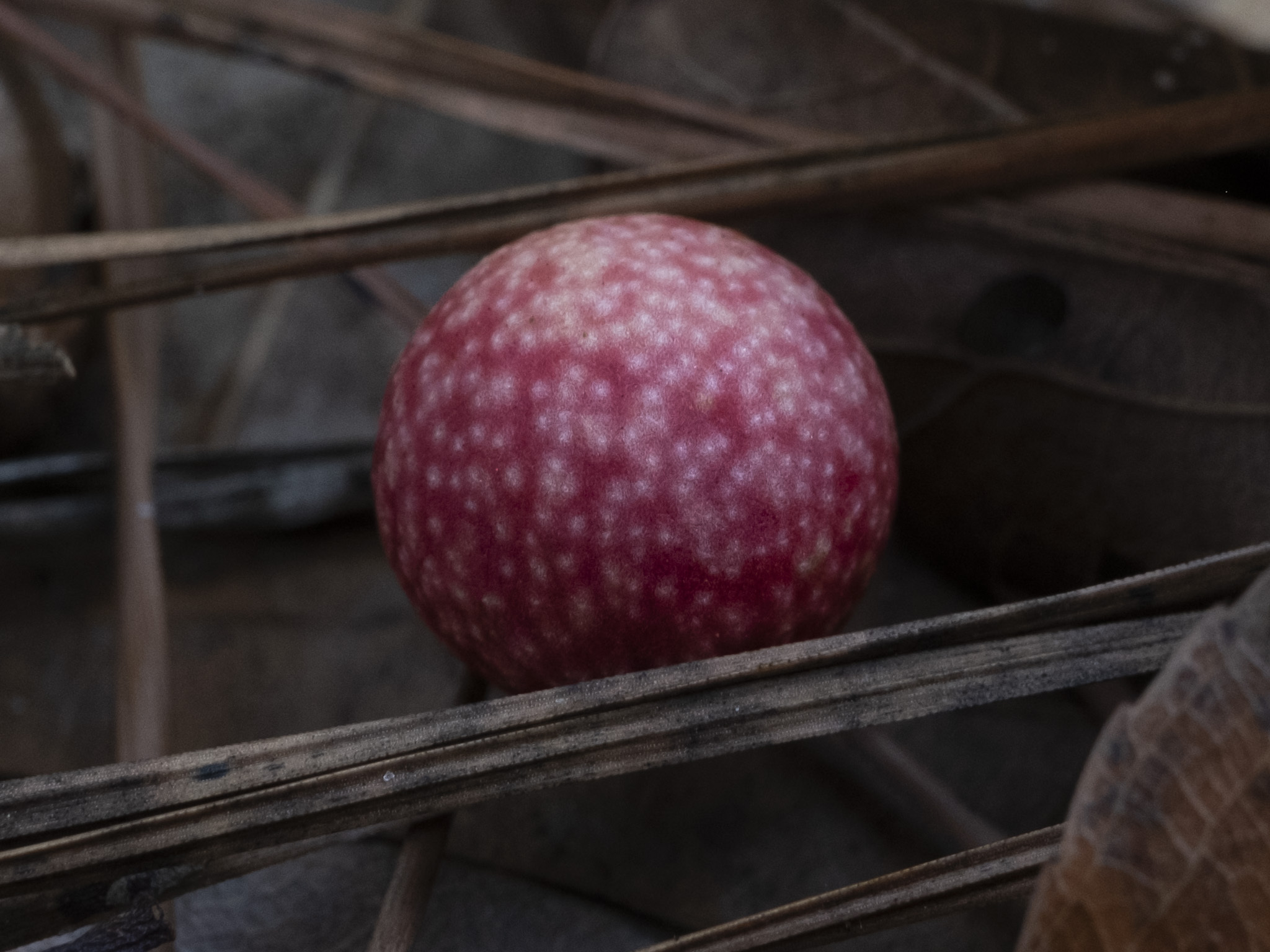
- Amphibolips quercusjuglans gall, Florida

Scientific classification
- Kingdom: Animalia
- Phylum: Arthropoda
- Class: Insecta
- Order: Hymenoptera
- Family: Cynipidae
- Tribe: Cynipini
- Genus: Amphibolips
- Species: A. quercusjuglans

Binomial name
- Amphibolips quercusjuglans (Osten Sacken, 1862)

= Amphibolips quercusjuglans =

Species of wasp

Amphibolips quercusjuglans, the acorn plum gall wasp, is a species of gall wasp in the family Cynipidae.
