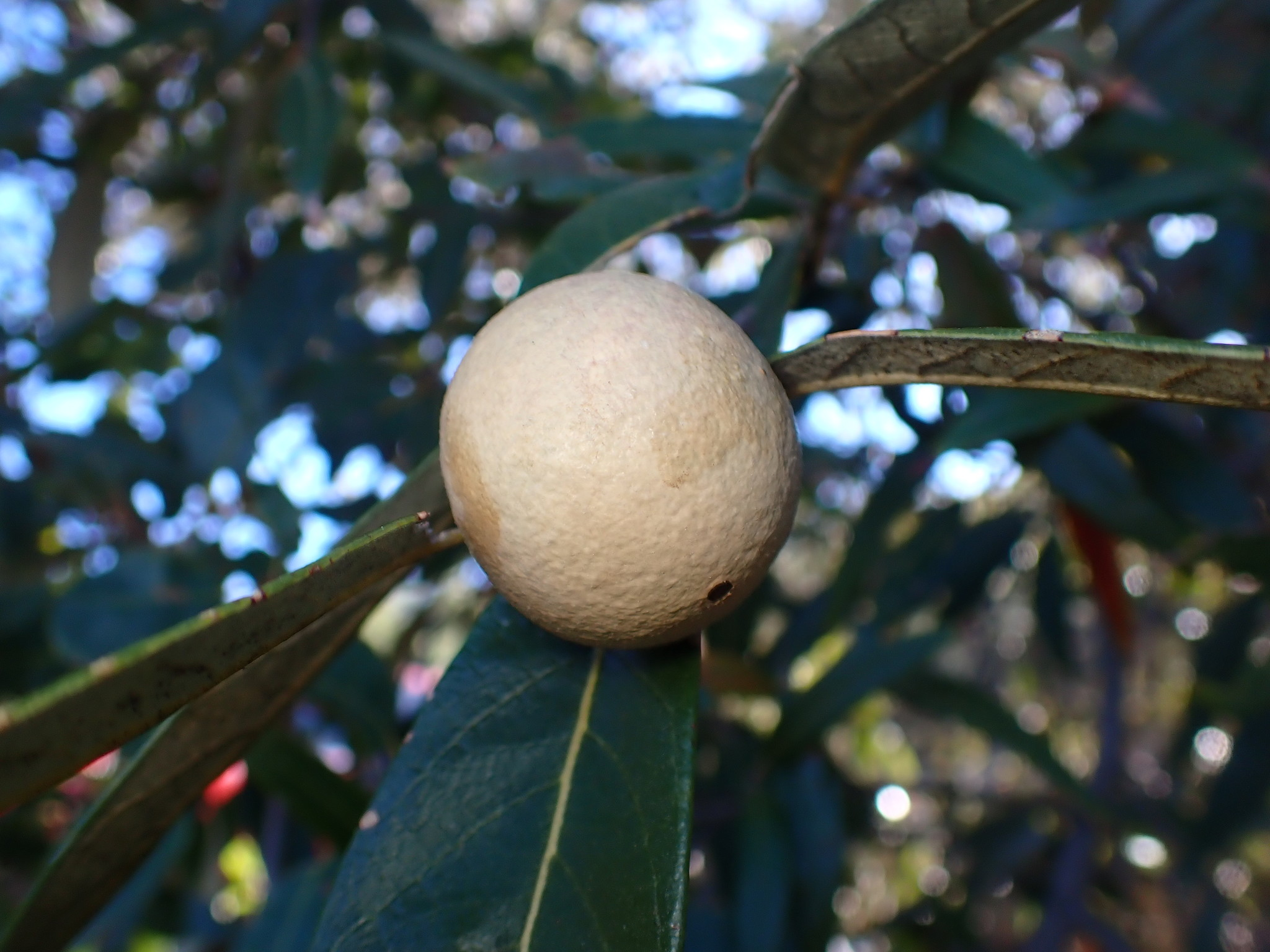

Scientific classification
- Kingdom: Animalia
- Phylum: Arthropoda
- Class: Insecta
- Order: Hymenoptera
- Family: Cynipidae
- Genus: Amphibolips
- Species: A. trizonata

Binomial name
- Amphibolips trizonata Ashmead, 1896

= Amphibolips trizonata =

Species of gall wasp

Amphibolips trizonata, also known as the ball-gall wasp, is a species of gall wasp found in southwestern North America. The wasps create their nurseries in the buds of Emory oaks and silverleaf oaks. The bisexual generation produces that leathery-skinned bud galls that start out green and turn beige over time. The galls are fairly large and noticeable, up to golf ball size. They are most commonly found on the sky islands of southern Arizona but have also been observed in southern New Mexico and west Texas, and like most galls of the southwestern U.S. its range most likely extends across the border into Mexico.
