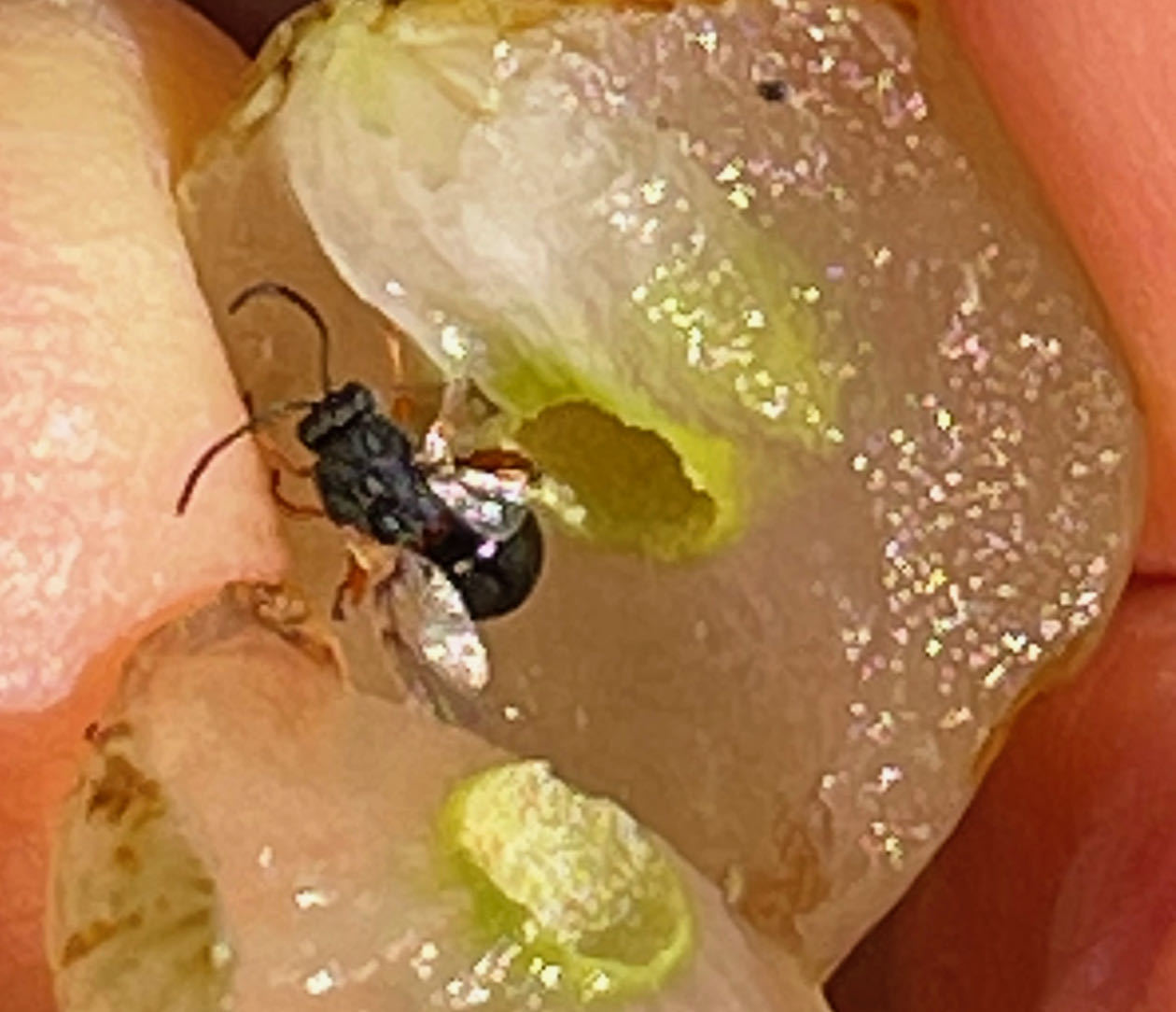

Scientific classification
- Kingdom: Animalia
- Phylum: Arthropoda
- Class: Insecta
- Order: Hymenoptera
- Family: Cynipidae
- Genus: Amphibolips
- Species: A. quercusracemaria

Binomial name
- Amphibolips quercusracemaria (Ashmead, 1881)

= Amphibolips quercusracemaria =

Species of wasp

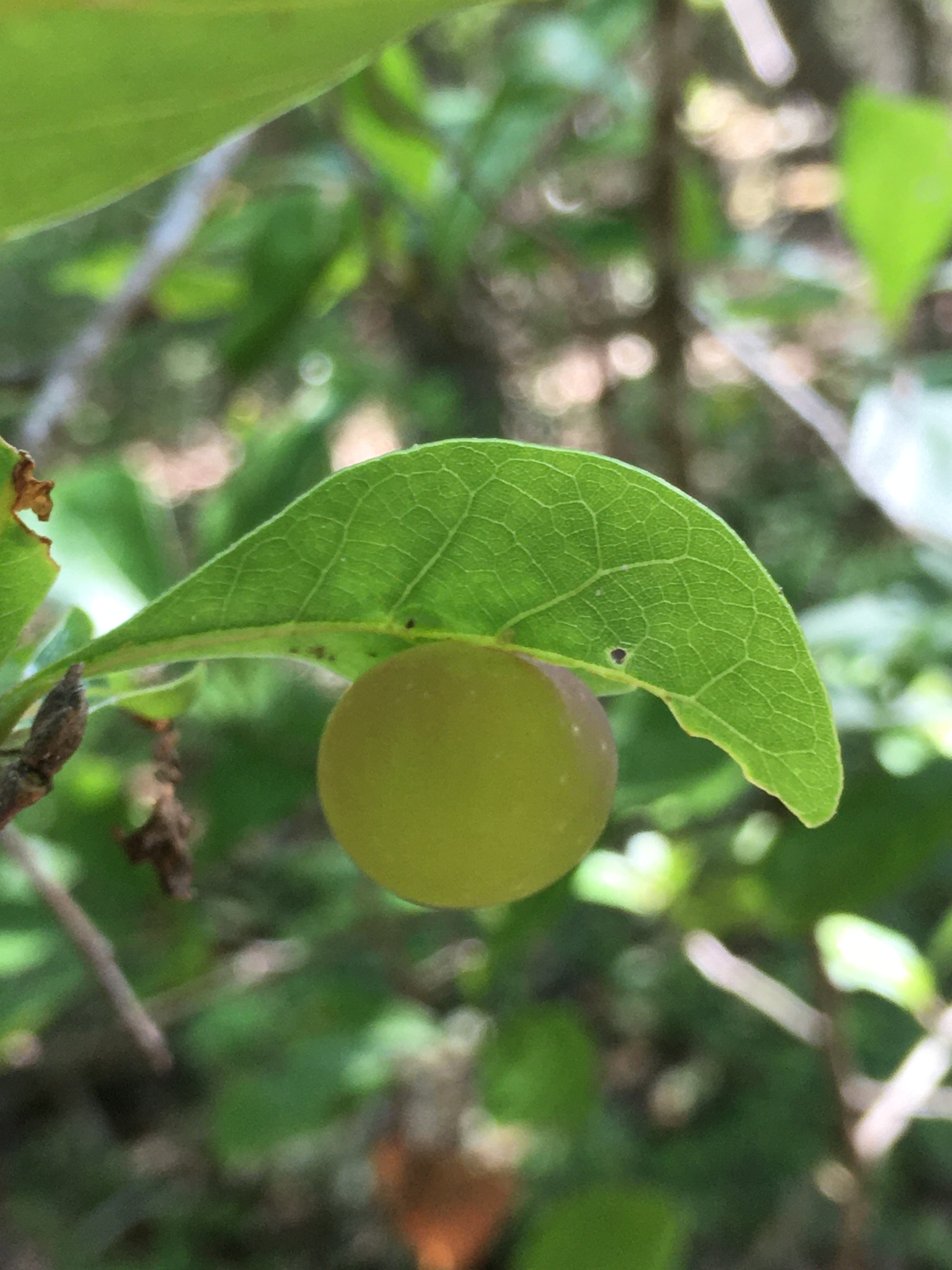
Gall caused by Amphibolips quercusracemaria

Amphibolips quercusracemaria is a species of gall wasp in the family Cynipidae.
