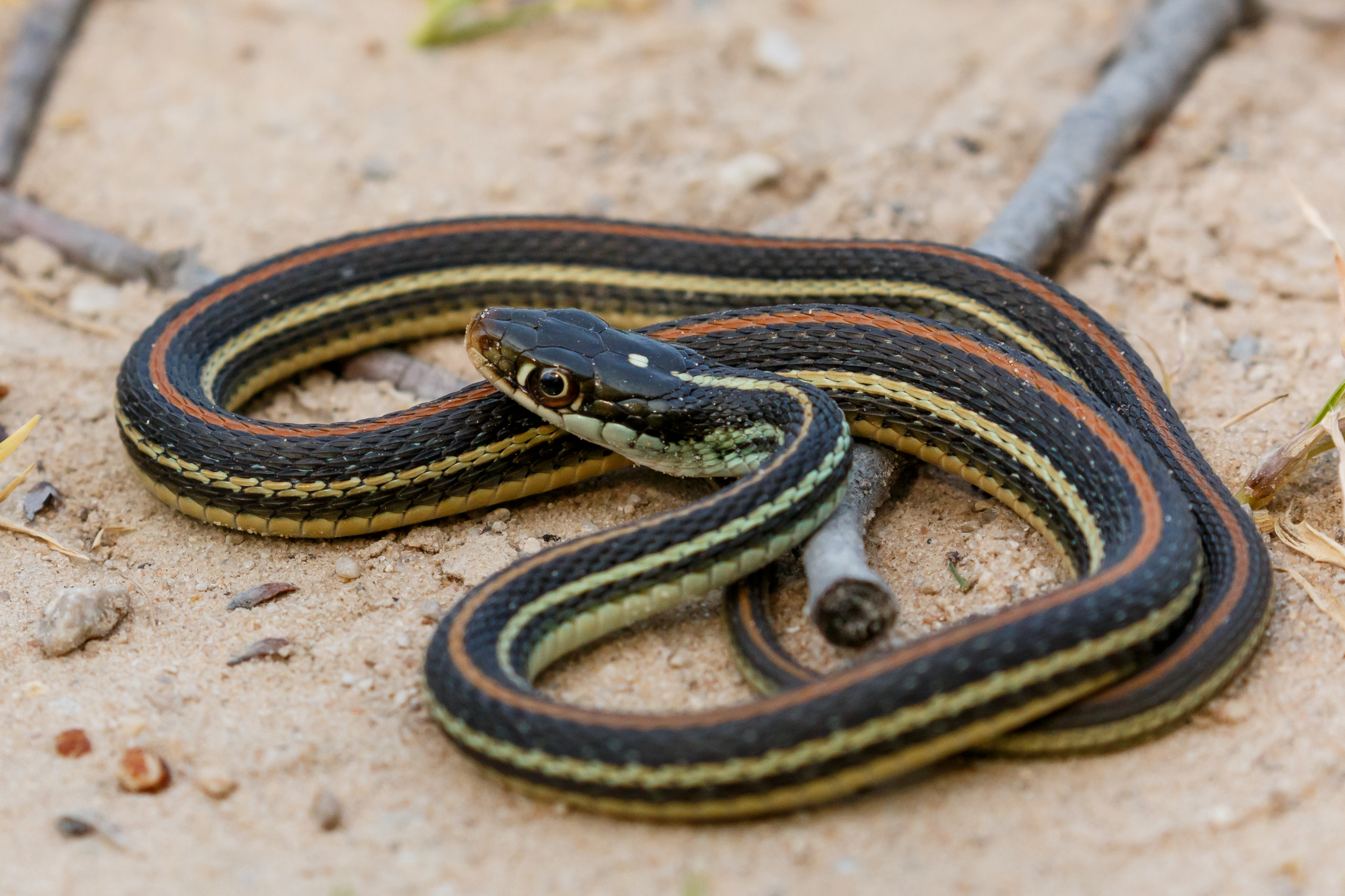
- In Texas

Conservation status
- Least Concern (IUCN 3.1)

Scientific classification
- Kingdom: Animalia
- Phylum: Chordata
- Class: Reptilia
- Order: Squamata
- Suborder: Serpentes
- Family: Colubridae
- Genus: Thamnophis
- Species: T. proximus

Binomial name
- Thamnophis proximus (Say, 1823)

Synonyms
- List: Coluber proximus Say, 1823; Eutaenia proxima — Baird & Girard, 1853; Thamnophis proxima — Garman, 1892; Thamnophis saurita proxima — Barbour & Cole, 1906; Thamnophis sauritus proximus — Burt, 1935; Thamnophis proximus — Rossman, 1963

= Thamnophis proximus =

Species of snake

Thamnophis proximus, commonly known as the western ribbon snake or western ribbonsnake, is a species of garter snake in the subfamily Natricinae of the family Colubridae. The species is found in the central and southern United States, Mexico, and Central America south to central Costa Rica. The species has six recognized subspecies.

== Description ==
T. proximus is a slender snake with a very long tail, approximately one-third of the total length of the body. Dorsally, T. proximus is blackish, brown, or olive with three light-colored stripes. Ventrally, it is greenish-white or yellowish-white. The upper labials are whitish and unmarked, contrasting with the dark top and sides of the head. The specific name, proximus, describes the species' similarity to T. saurita.

Adults measure 17–50 in (43–127 cm) in total length (including the tail).

== Subspecies ==
Six subspecies of the western ribbon snake (T. proximus) are recognized as being valid, including the nominate subspecies.

- T. p. alpinus Rossman, 1963 – Chiapas Highlands ribbon snake
- T. p. diabolicus Rossman, 1963 – arid land ribbon snake
- T. p. orarius Rossman, 1963 – Gulf Coast ribbon snake
- T. p. proximus (Say, 1823) – orangestripe ribbon snake, western ribbon snake
- T. p. rubrilineatus Rossman, 1963 – redstripe ribbon snake
- T. p. rutiloris (Cope, 1885) – Mexican ribbon snake

Nota bene: A trinomial authority in parentheses indicates that the subspecies was originally described in a genus other than Thamnophis.

== Ecology ==
T. proximus is a semiaquatic snake that occurs in a wide range of habitats, usually not far from water. It can be found from sea level to nearly 2,500 m (8,200 ft). It feeds on a range of invertebrates (earthworms, crayfish) and small vertebrates (lizards, fishes, and frogs, including tadpoles). They serve as prey for birds (hawks, owls, egrets, herons) and mammals (coyotes, foxes, raccoons, minks).

== Gallery ==
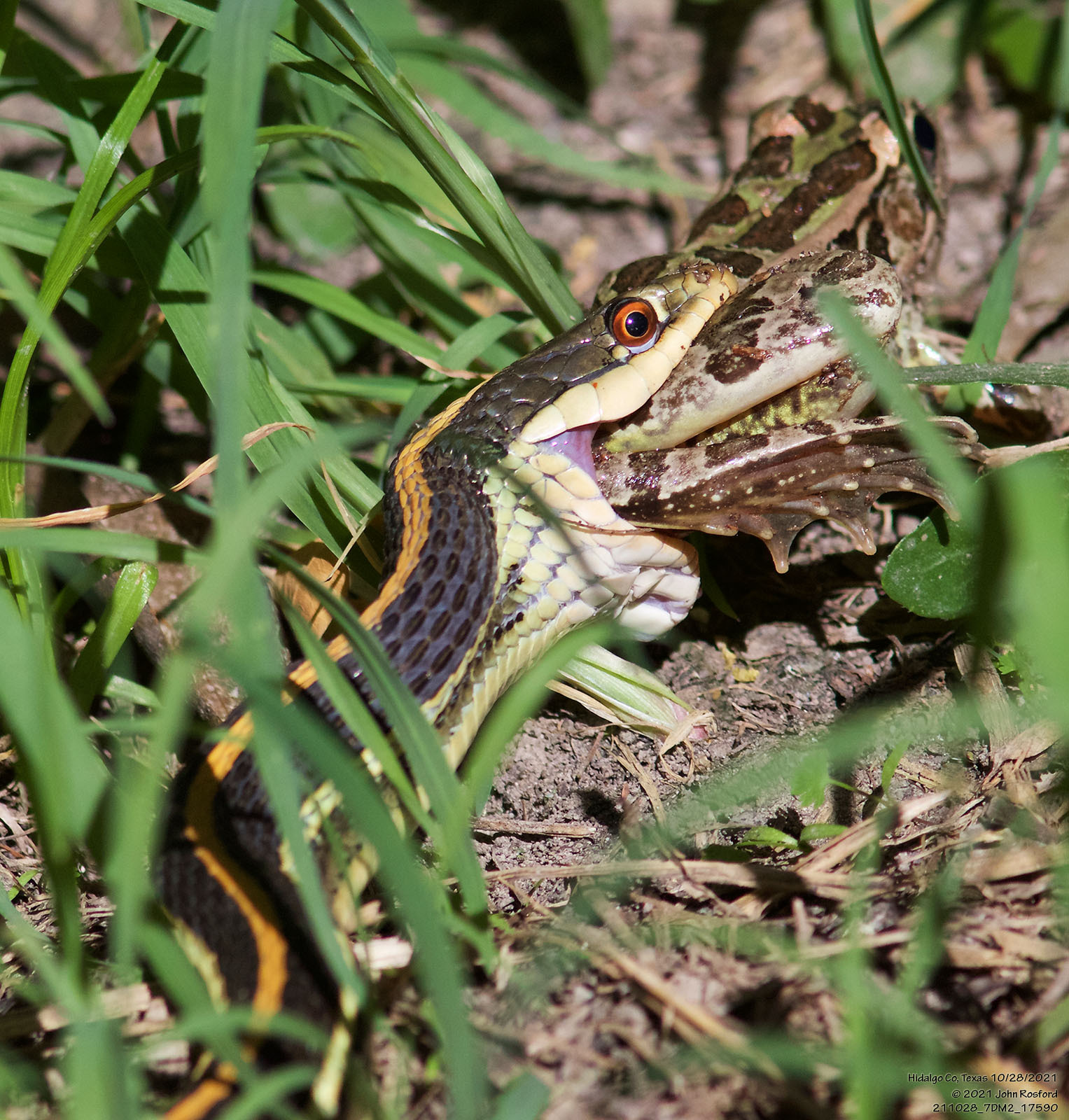
T. p. orarius feeding on a Rio Grande leopard frog, in Texas

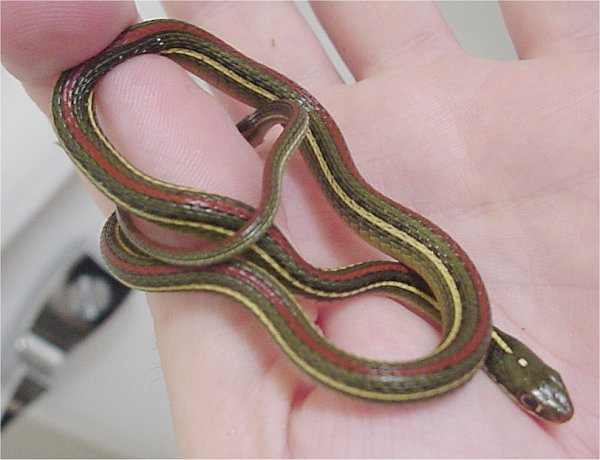
T. p. rubrilineatus

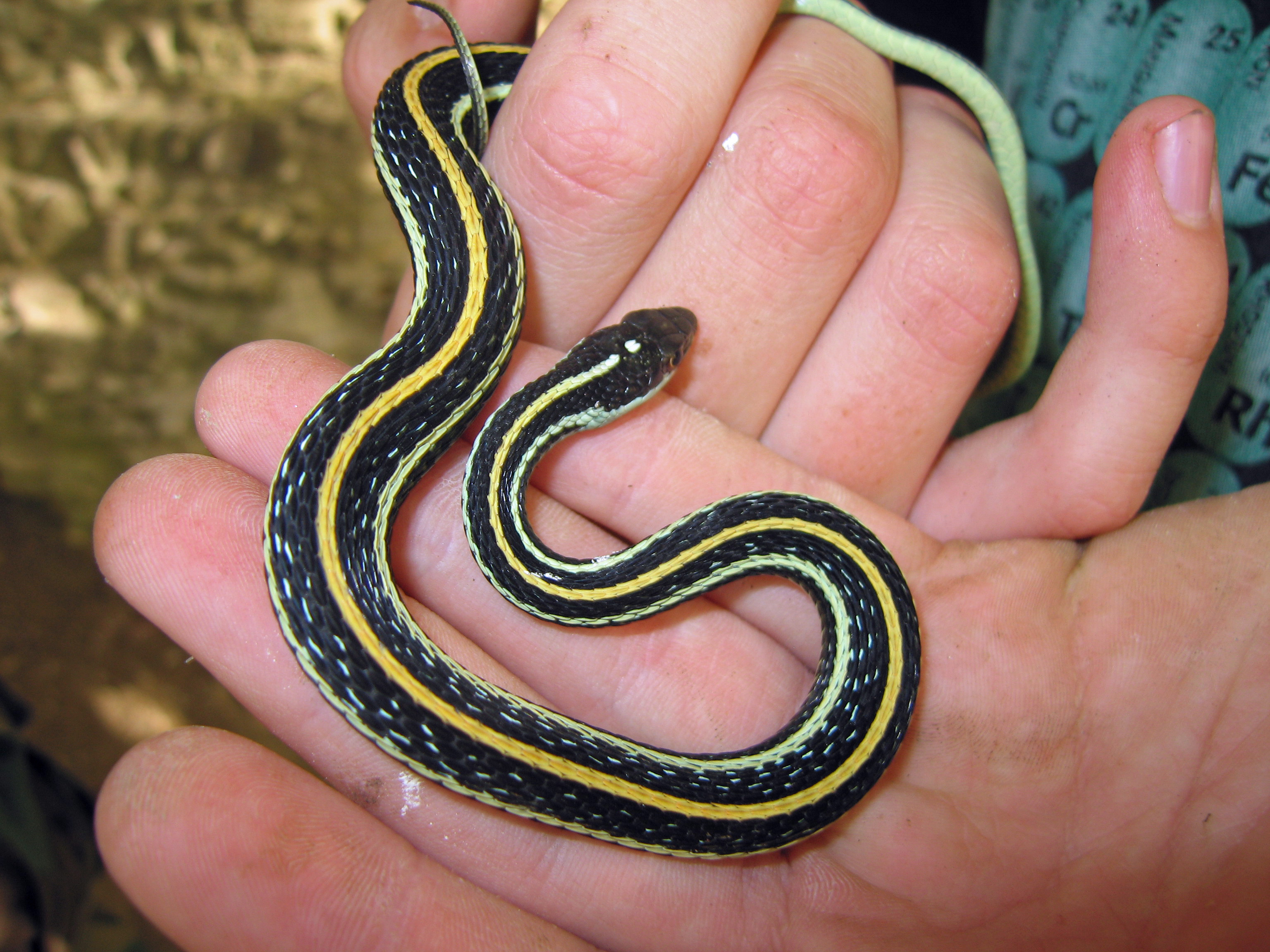
In Illinois
