= Rossman's garter snake =

Conservation status
- Data Deficient (IUCN 3.1)

Scientific classification
- Kingdom: Animalia
- Phylum: Chordata
- Class: Reptilia
- Order: Squamata
- Suborder: Serpentes
- Family: Colubridae
- Genus: Thamnophis
- Species: T. rossmani

Binomial name
- Thamnophis rossmani Conant, 2000

Species of snake

Rossman's garter snake (Thamnophis rossmani) is a species of snake in the family Colubridae. The species is endemic to Mexico.

== Etymology ==
The specific name rossmani is in honor of the American herpetologist Douglas A. Rossman.

== Geographic range ==
T. rossmani is found in the Mexican state of Nayarit.

== Habitat ==
The natural habitat of T. rossmani is freshwater wetlands.

== Reproduction ==
T. rossmani is viviparous. A female was observed giving birth to four live young. Each neonate had a snout-to-vent length of about 5 cm (2.0 in).
