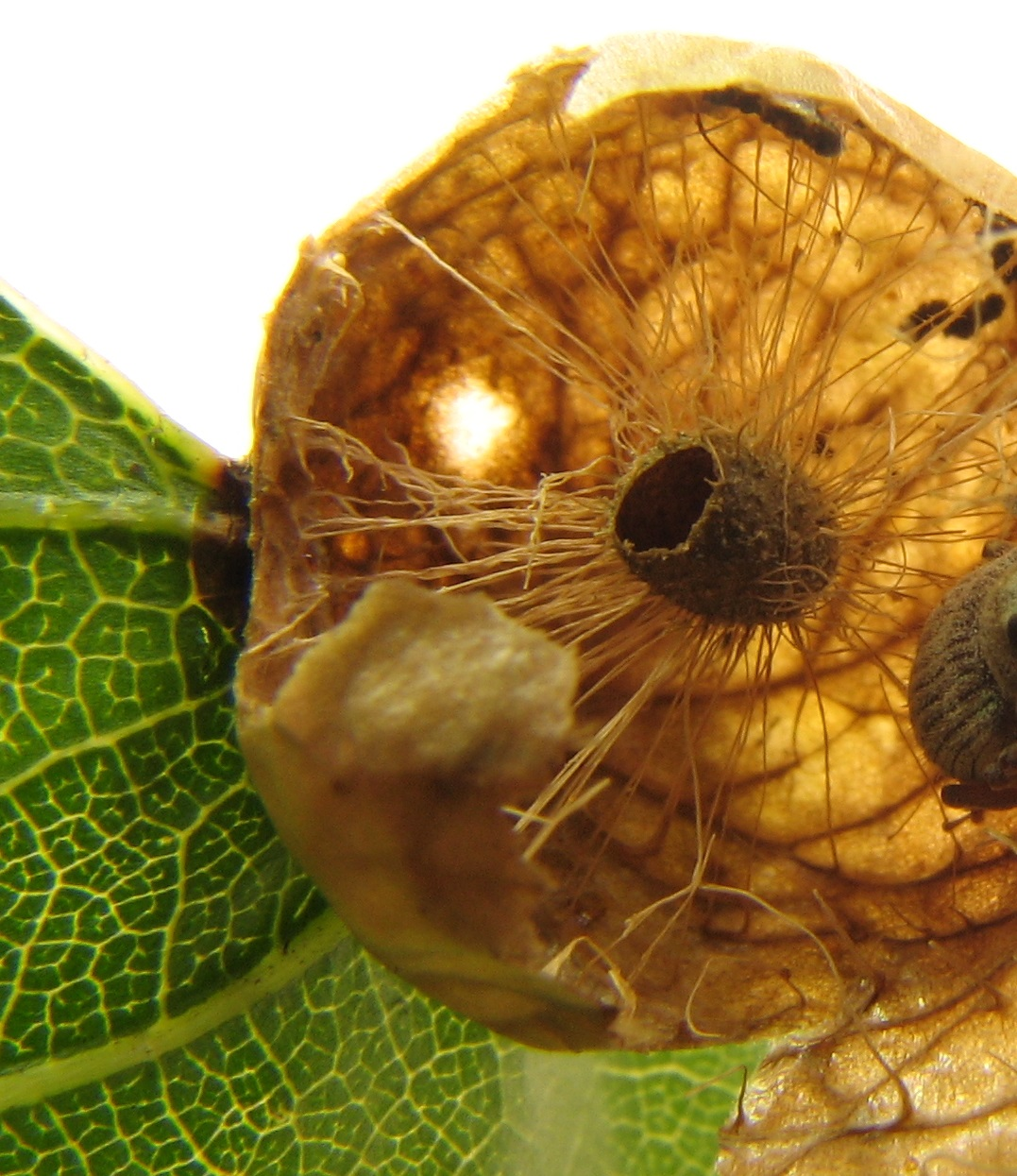
- Gall made by Amphibolips quercusinanis on oak leaf

Scientific classification
- Kingdom: Animalia
- Phylum: Arthropoda
- Class: Insecta
- Order: Hymenoptera
- Family: Cynipidae
- Tribe: Cynipini
- Genus: Amphibolips; Reinhard, 1865

= Amphibolips =

Genus of wasps

Amphibolips is an American genus of gall wasps in the family Cynipidae. There are about 57 described species in the genus Amphibolips with several others still undescribed.

== Species ==
The following species belong to the genus Amphibolips:

- Amphibolips acuminata Ashmead, 1896
- Amphibolips aliciae Medianero & Nieves-Aldrey, 2010
- Amphibolips arbensis Mehes, 1953
- Amphibolips bassae Cuesta-Porta et al, 2020
- Amphibolips bromus Cuesta-Porta et al, 2020
- Amphibolips castroviejoi Medianero & Nieves-Aldrey, 2010
- Amphibolips cibriani Pujade-Villar, 2018
- Amphibolips comini Cuesta-Porta et al, 2020
- Amphibolips confluenta (Harris, 1841) - Spongy oak apple gall wasp
- Amphibolips cookii Gillette, 1888
- Amphibolips dampfi Kinsey, 1937
- Amphibolips durangensis Nieves-Aldrey et al, 2012
- Amphibolips elatus Kinsey, 1937
- Amphibolips ellipsoidalis Weld, 1926
- Amphibolips femoratus (Ashmead, 1887)
- Amphibolips fusus Kinsey, 1937
- Amphibolips gainesi Bassett, 1900
- Amphibolips globulus Beutenmüller
- Amphibolips globus Weld
- Amphibolips gumia Kinsey, 1937
- Amphibolips hidalgoensis Pujade-Villar & Melika, 2011
- Amphibolips ilicifoliae Basset, 1864
- Amphibolips jaliscensis Nieves-Aldrey et al, 2012
- Amphibolips jubatus Kinsey, 1937
- Amphibolips kinseyi Castillejos-Lemus, Oyama, & Nieves-Aldrey, 2020
- Amphibolips magnigalla Castillejos-Lemus, Oyama, & Nieves-Aldrey, 2020
- Amphibolips maturus Kinsey, 1937
- Amphibolips melanocera Ashmead, 1885
- Amphibolips michoacaensis Nieves-Aldrey et al, 2012
- Amphibolips montana Beutenmüller
- Amphibolips murata Weld, 1957
- Amphibolips nassa Kinsey, 1937
- Amphibolips nebris Kinsey, 1937
- Amphibolips nevadensis Nieves-Aldrey et al, 2012
- Amphibolips niger Beutenmüller, 1911
- Amphibolips nigrialatus Castillejos-Lemus, Oyama, & Nieves-Aldrey, 2020
- Amphibolips nubilipennis Beutenmüller, 1909 - Translucent oak gall wasp
- Amphibolips oaxacae Nieves-Aldrey et al, 2012
- Amphibolips quercuscinerea Ashmead, 1881
- Amphibolips quercuscitriformis Ashmead, 1881
- Amphibolips quercuscoelebs Osten Sacken, 1861
- Amphibolips quercusfuliginosa Ashmead, 1885
- Amphibolips quercusinanis Osten Sacken, 1861 - Larger empty oak apple wasp
- Amphibolips quercusjuglans (Osten Sacken, 1862) - Acorn plum gall wasp
- Amphibolips quercusostensackenii Felt, 1917
- Amphibolips quercuspomiformis Kinsey, 1922 - Apple gall wasp
- Amphibolips quercusracemaria Ashmead, 1881
- Amphibolips quercusrugosa Ashmead, 1881
- Amphibolips quercusspongifica Osten Sacken, 1861
- Amphibolips rulli Cuesta-Porta et al, 2020
- Amphibolips salicifoliae Cuesta-Porta et al, 2020
- Amphibolips spinosa Ashmead, 1887
- Amphibolips tarasco Nieves-Aldrey et al, 2012
- Amphibolips tinctoriae Ashmead, 1896
- Amphibolips trizonata Ashmead, 1896
- Amphibolips turulli Cuesta-Porta et al, 2020
- Amphibolips zacatecaensis Melika & Pujade-Villar, 2011
