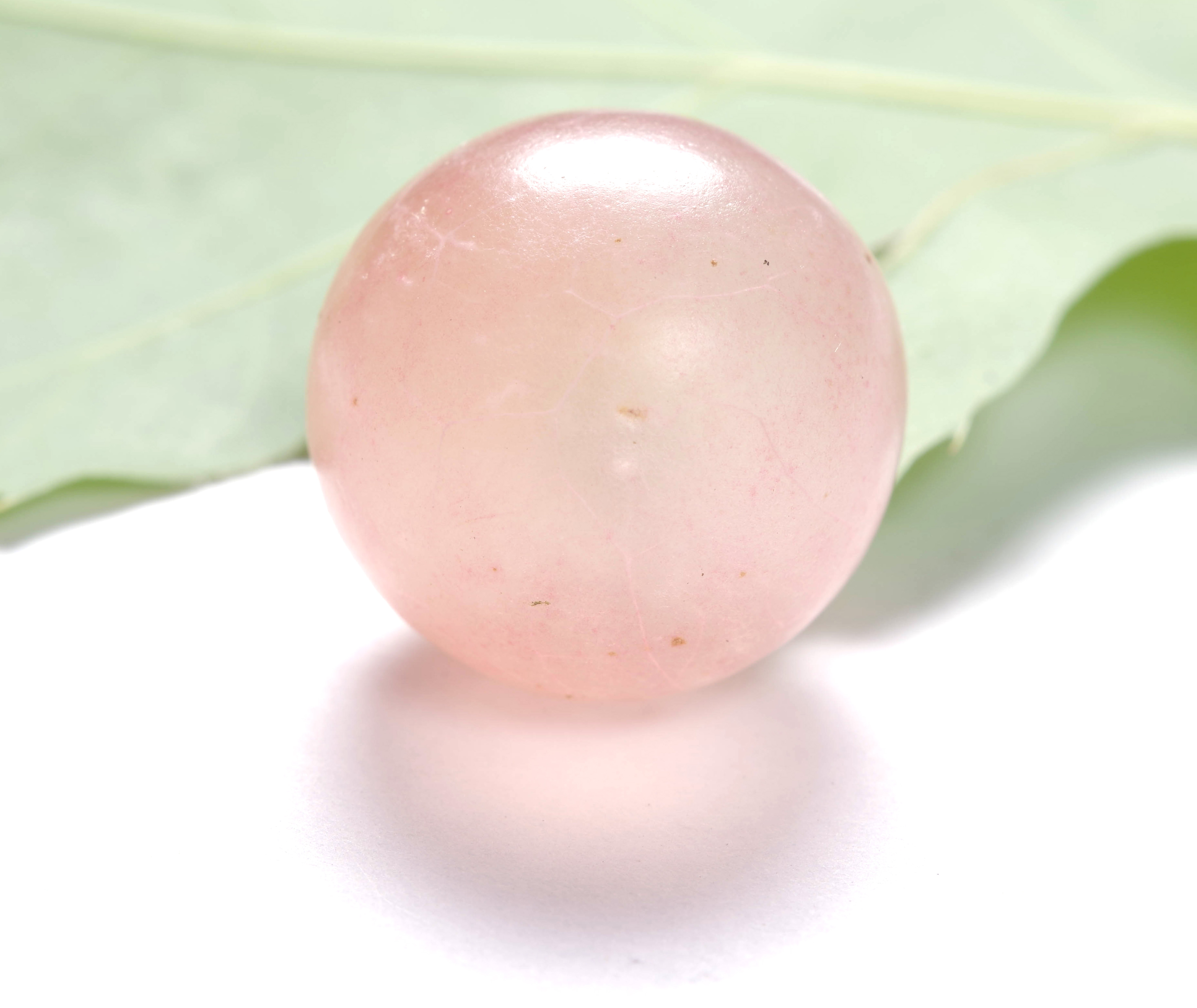
- The translucent oak gall, induced by the sexual generation of Amphibolips nubilipennis.

Scientific classification
- Kingdom: Animalia
- Phylum: Arthropoda
- Class: Insecta
- Order: Hymenoptera
- Family: Cynipidae
- Genus: Amphibolips
- Species: A. nubilipennis

Binomial name
- Amphibolips nubilipennis Harris, 1841

= Amphibolips nubilipennis =

North American gall-inducing wasp

Amphibolips nubilipennis, known generally as the translucent oak gall wasp, is a species of gall wasp in the family Cynipidae. Its range includes Ontario, Quebec, and much of the eastern United States. Hosts include Quercus buckleyi, Quercus coccinea, Quercus falcata, Quercus ilicifolia, Quercus imbricaria, Quercus marilandica, Quercus rubra, and Quercus velutina.

The translucent oak gall is induced by the sexual generation of Amphibolips nubilipennis. This gall is succulent and accumulates high concentration of malic acid causing a low pH of gall tissues. The extreme acidity of the translucent oak gall tissues has been proposed to represent a defensive strategy against parasitoid wasps.
