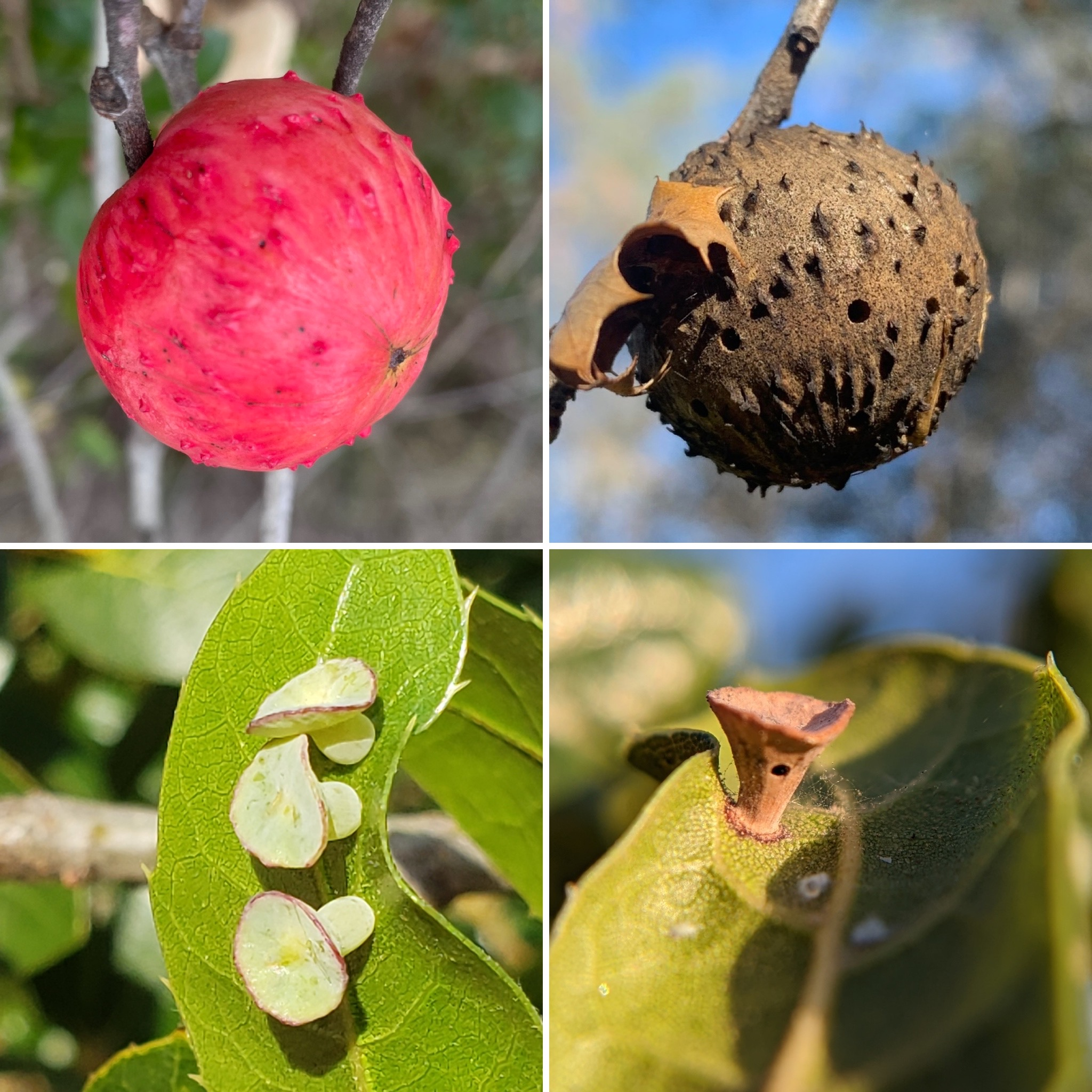
- Young unisexual-stage stem gall, older unisexual-stage stem gall with visible exit holes, young bisexual-stage leaf galls, older bisexual-stage gall with visible exit hole

Scientific classification
- Kingdom: Animalia
- Phylum: Arthropoda
- Class: Insecta
- Order: Hymenoptera
- Family: Cynipidae
- Genus: Amphibolips
- Species: A. quercuspomiformis

Binomial name
- Amphibolips quercuspomiformis (Bassett, 1881) Cuesta-Porta, Equihua-Martínez, Estrada-Venegas, Cibrián-Tovar, Barrera-Ruíz, Silva, Sánchez, Melika & Pujade-Villar, 2020

Synonyms
- Andricus pomiformis; Andricus yosemite; Callirhytis maculipennis; Callirhytis pomiformis; Callirhytis quercuspomiformis; Callirhytis rossi; Cynips quercus pomiformis

= Amphibolips quercuspomiformis =

Genus of insects

Amphibolips quercuspomiformis, also known as the apple gall wasp or live oak apple gall wasp, is a species of gall wasp. It induces galls in coast live oak and interior live oak trees. Like many gall wasps, it has two alternating generations which induce differing galls: an all-female parthenogenic generation, and a bisexual generation. The galls formed by the unisexual generation in summer are spherical, up to 40 mm in diameter, and covered with short spines. They form on stems and are green or red when new, then turn brown. The galls formed by the bisexual generation in spring are small, shaped like toadstools, and occur on leaves.
