= Amphibolips gainesi =

Scientific classification
- Kingdom: Animalia
- Phylum: Arthropoda
- Class: Insecta
- Order: Hymenoptera
- Family: Cynipidae
- Genus: Amphibolips
- Species: A. gainesi

Binomial name
- Amphibolips gainesi Bassett, 1900

Species of wasp

Amphibolips gainesi is a species of gall wasp in the family Cynipidae.
