= Carl Robert Osten-Sacken =

Russian diplomat and entomologist (1828–1906)

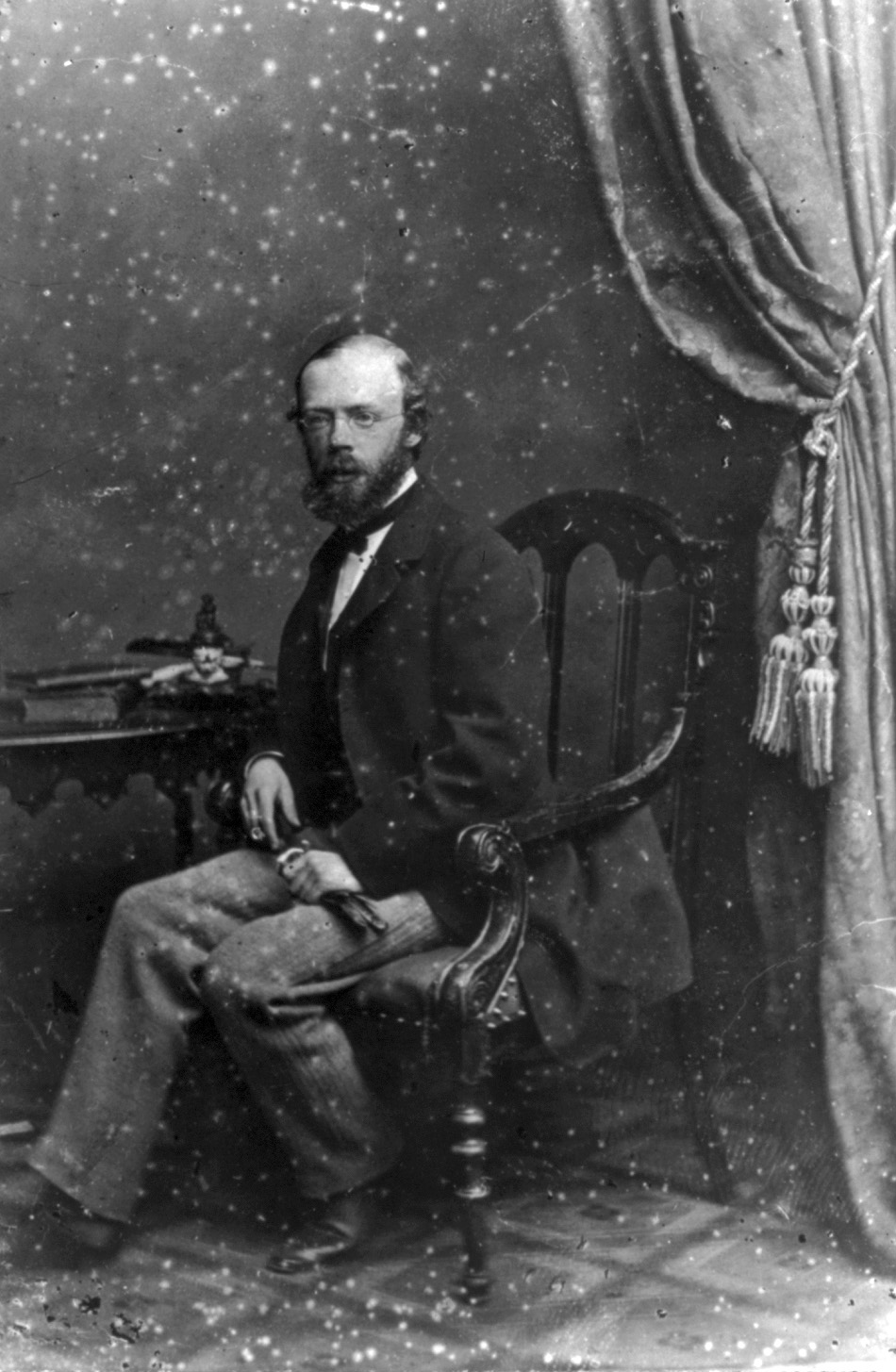
- Carl Robert Osten-Sacken
- Born: 21 August 1828; St. Petersburg, Russian Empire
- Died: 20 May 1906 (aged 77); Heidelberg, German Empire
- Occupations: Diplomat and entomologist
- Known for: German-Russian consul general in New York City during the American Civil War; foundational contributions to study of North American flies

Carl Robert Osten-Sacken or Carl-Robert Romanovich, Baron von der Osten-Sacken, Baron Osten Sacken (21 August 1828 – 20 May 1906) was a German-Russian diplomat and entomologist. He served as the Russian consul general in New York City during the American Civil War, living in the United States from 1856 to 1877. He worked on the taxonomy of flies in general and particularly of the family Tipulidae (crane flies).

== Biography ==
He took an interest in insects at the age of eleven through the influence of Joseph N. Schatiloff, a Russian coleopterist. In 1849 he joined the Imperial Foreign Office and while still in Russia he published his first entomological papers, including an account of the species found in the suburbs of St. Petersburg.

In 1856, he was sent to Washington, D.C. to serve as secretary of the Russian legation. During his two-month trip to America, he visited some of Europe’s leading entomologists, including Hermann August Hagen, then living in Konigsberg. In the mid-1860s Osten Sacken helped Hagen secure a position at Harvard, where he became the first entomologist in the United States to hold the formal title, Professor of Entomology. In 1862 Osten Sacken was named the Russian consul general in New York City, a post he held until 1871.

He developed an early interest in entomology specialising in Diptera and especially the Tipulidae. In 1862 Osten-Sacken published, with assistance from Hermann Loew, “Catalogue of the described Diptera of North America” in Smithsonian Miscellaneous Collections, Vol. 3. A later edition of this work appeared in 1878, as Smithsonian Miscellaneous Collections, No. 270. He published many other papers. His work on the Tipulidae included a classification of the family. He also studied insect galls and worked on the Tabanidae. Osten-Sacken corresponded with Hermann Loew, supplying him with specimens, and translated and published Loew's work in the "Monographs of the Diptera of North America", (1862-1873), Smithsonian Miscellaneous Collections, Nos. 6, 171, 219, 256. He proposed the term chaetotaxy.

Osten-Sacken helped establish the study of North American flies and donated his personal insect collection to the Museum of Comparative Zoology in Cambridge, Massachusetts before leaving for Europe. Asteroid 335 Roberta was named in his honor. A subspecies of North American snake, Thamnophis sauritus sackenii, was named in his honour by Robert Kennicott in 1859. The cynipid gall wasp Amphibolips quercusostensackenii Bassett, 1863 is named in his honour. Sacken's velvet ant was named for him in 1865.

== Bibliography ==
- "Остен-Сакен, Роберт Романович" . Brockhaus and Efron Encyclopedic Dictionary (in Russian). 1906.
- Alexander CP (1969). "Baron Osten Sacken and his Influence on American Dipterology". Annual Review of Entomology. 14: 1–19. doi:10.1146/annurev.en.14.010169.000245.
- Essig, E. O. (1931). A History of Entomology. MacMillan Company. pp. 724–727.
- Mallis, Arnold (1971). American Entomologists. Rutgers University Press. pp. 381–384.
- Osten-Sacken CR (1903). Record of My Life-work in Entomology. Cambridge, Massachusetts: Self published. 240 pp.
- Sterling, Keir B. (2000). Osten Sacken, Carl Robert Romanovich von der (1828-1906). American National Biography Online. Oxford University Press. doi:10.1093/anb/9780198606697.article.1301249.
