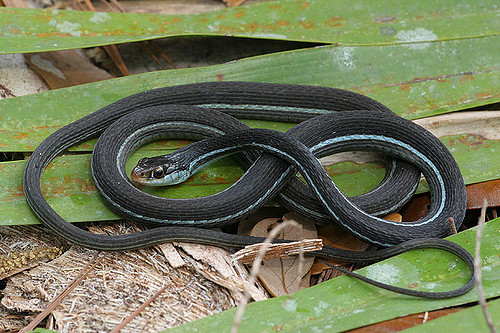

Scientific classification
- Domain: Eukaryota
- Kingdom: Animalia
- Phylum: Chordata
- Class: Reptilia
- Order: Squamata
- Suborder: Serpentes
- Family: Colubridae
- Genus: Thamnophis
- Species: T. saurita
- Subspecies: T. s. nitae

Trinomial name
- Thamnophis saurita nitae Rossman, 1963

= Bluestripe ribbon snake =

Subspecies of snake

The bluestripe ribbon snake (Thamnophis saurita nitae), which belongs in the same family as the garter snakes, is a subspecies of the ribbon snake that occurs along the Gulf Coast in Florida. Adults are thin and are black with a mid-dorsal stripe that is a lighter shade of black and two blue stripes, hence the name "bluestripe ribbon snake". They are semi-aquatic and are active during the day. They can be found by lakes, rivers, and slow-moving streams.

== Diet ==
They eat frogs, salamanders, small fishes, earthworms, minnows, lizards, and insects.

== Size ==
In adulthood they grow to be 45 to 63 cm (18 to 25 in). They start out at 17 to 18 cm (6.5 to 7 in) after hatching.
