= Asian house gecko =

Asian house gecko may refer to:

- Hemidactylus frenatus
- Hemidactylus platyurus
