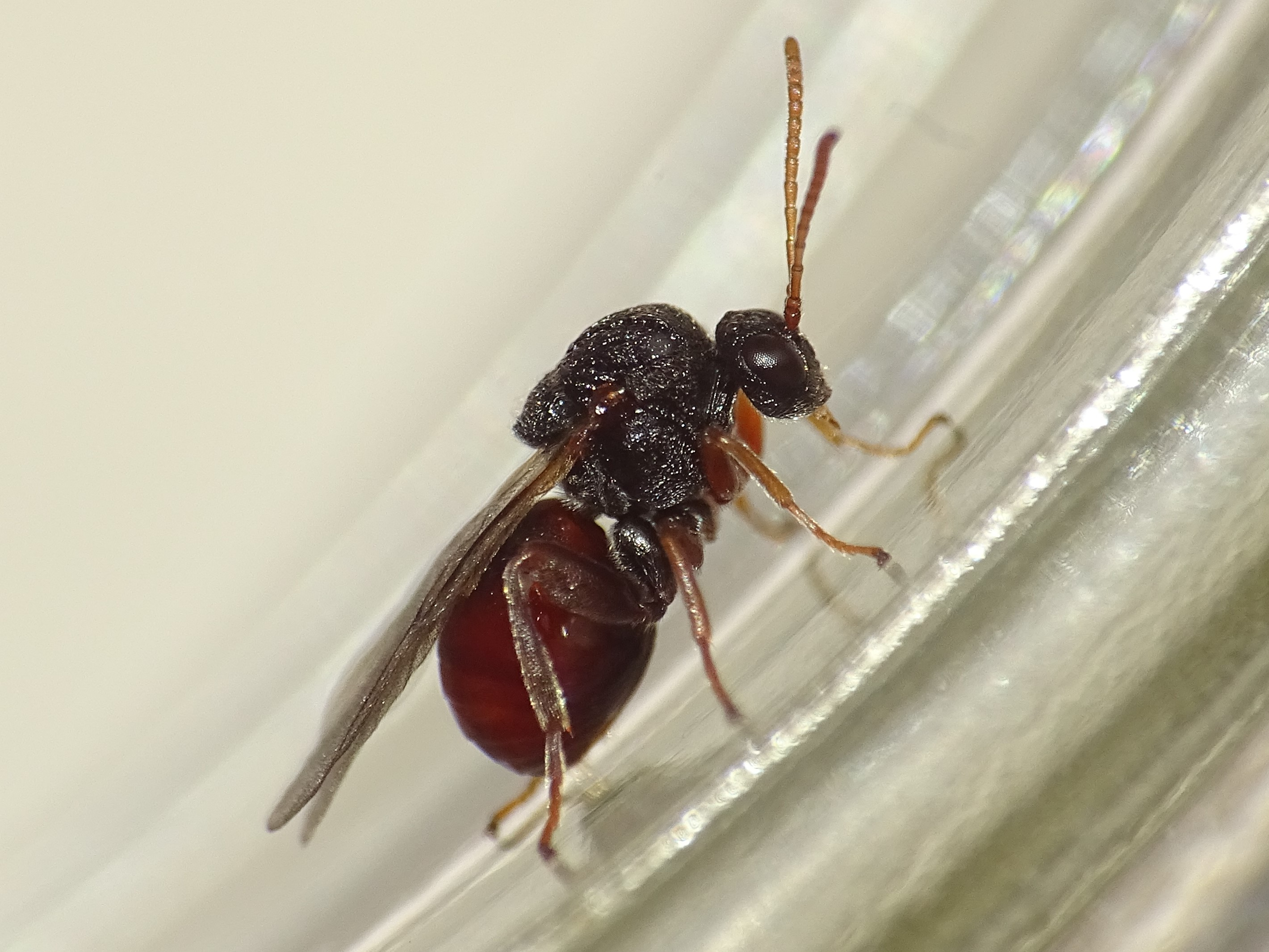
- Adult Amphibolips quercusostensackenii
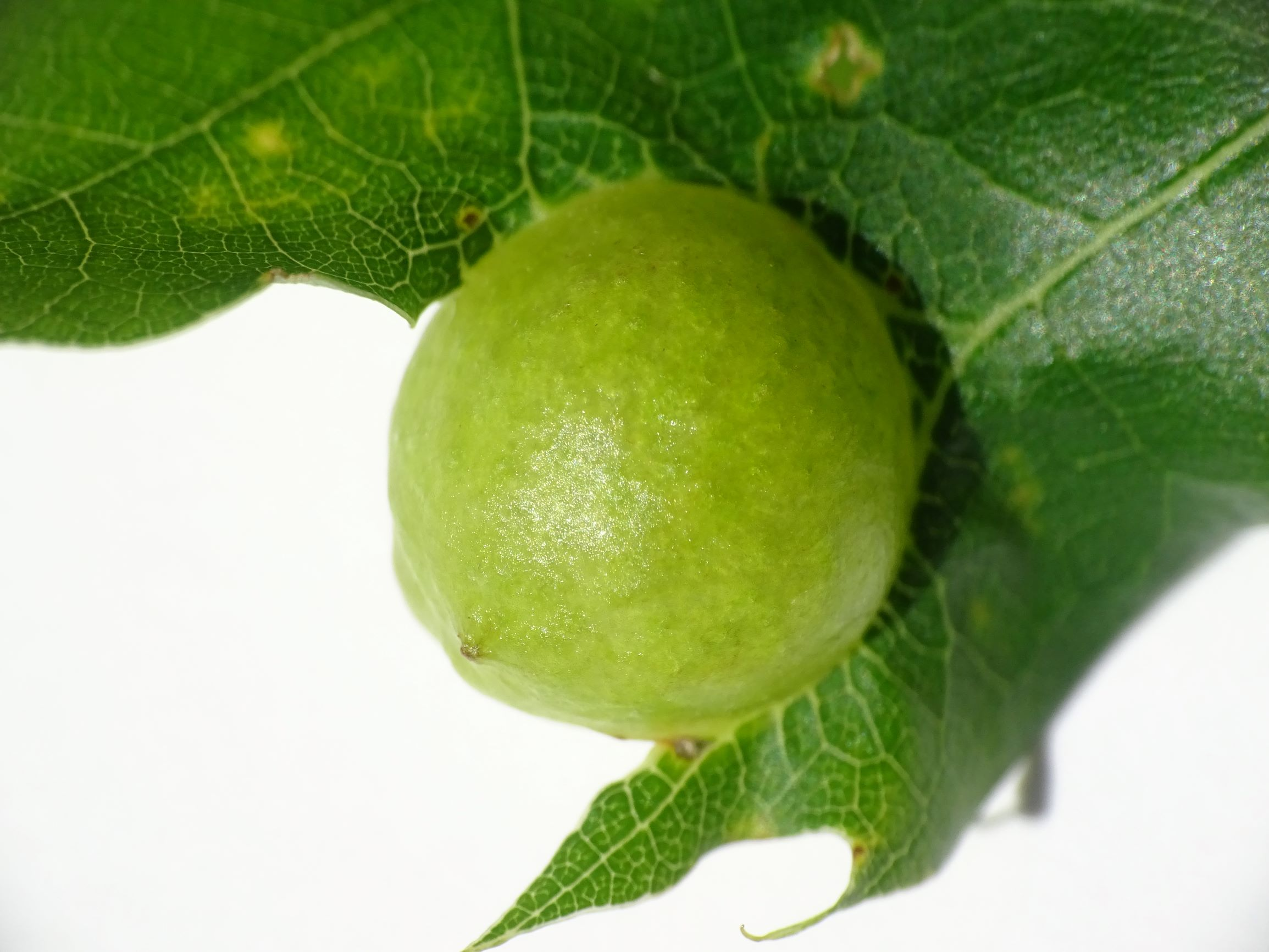
- Gall induced by Amphibolips quercusostensackenii on Quercus rubra

Scientific classification
- Kingdom: Animalia
- Phylum: Arthropoda
- Class: Insecta
- Order: Hymenoptera
- Family: Cynipidae
- Genus: Amphibolips
- Species: A. quercusostensackenii

Binomial name
- Amphibolips quercusostensackenii Bassett, 1863

= Amphibolips quercusostensackenii =

Species of wasp

Amphibolips quercusostensackenii is a species of gall wasp in the family Cynipidae. It is found throughout eastern North America.

== Description ==
This species induces globular galls on the leaves of members of the red oak group (Quercus sect. Lobatae). These galls are roughly 7 to 9 mm in diameter, and contain a central filament-supported cell where pupation occurs.

== Life History ==
These galls develop in the spring. Adults are described to have emerged from the galls between 8 and 15 July in the Chicago area.

== Taxonomy ==
This species was originally placed in the genus Andricus. However, a 2002 review reclassified it to the closely related genus Amphibolips based on the morphology of the adult wasp.

== Gallery ==
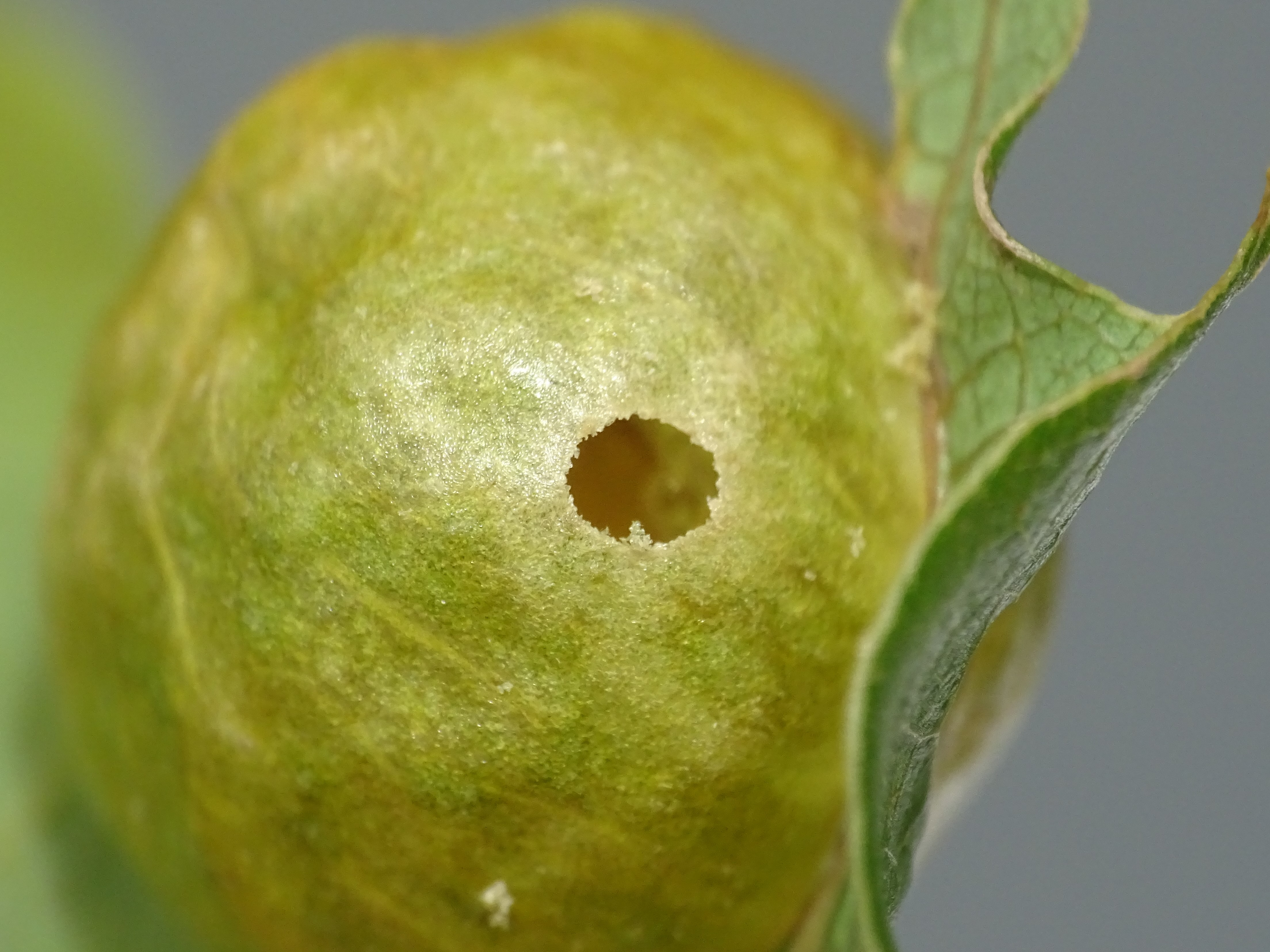
Exit hole of the gall created by the adult wasp

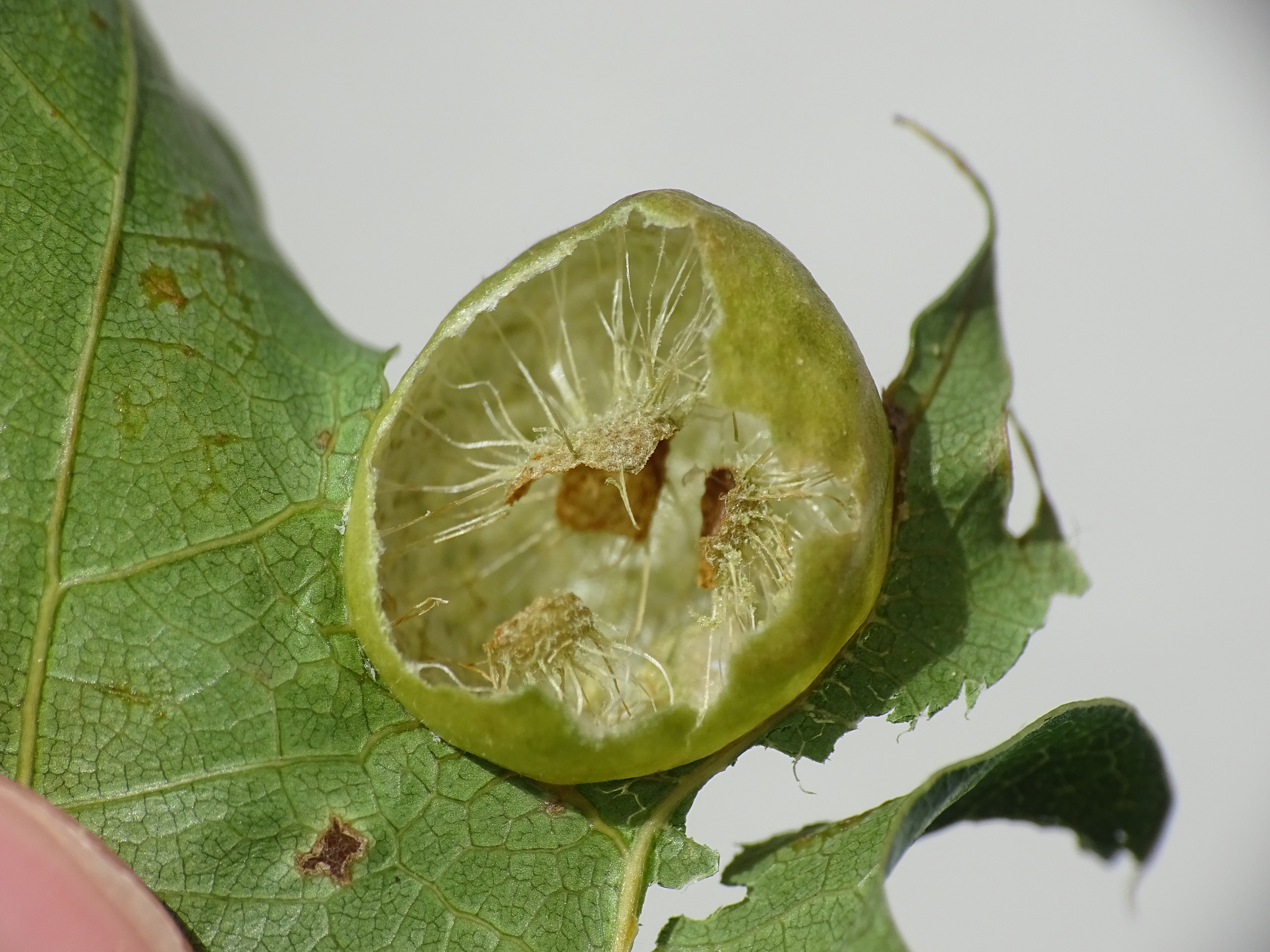
The interior of the gall, showing the filament-suspended cell in the centre
