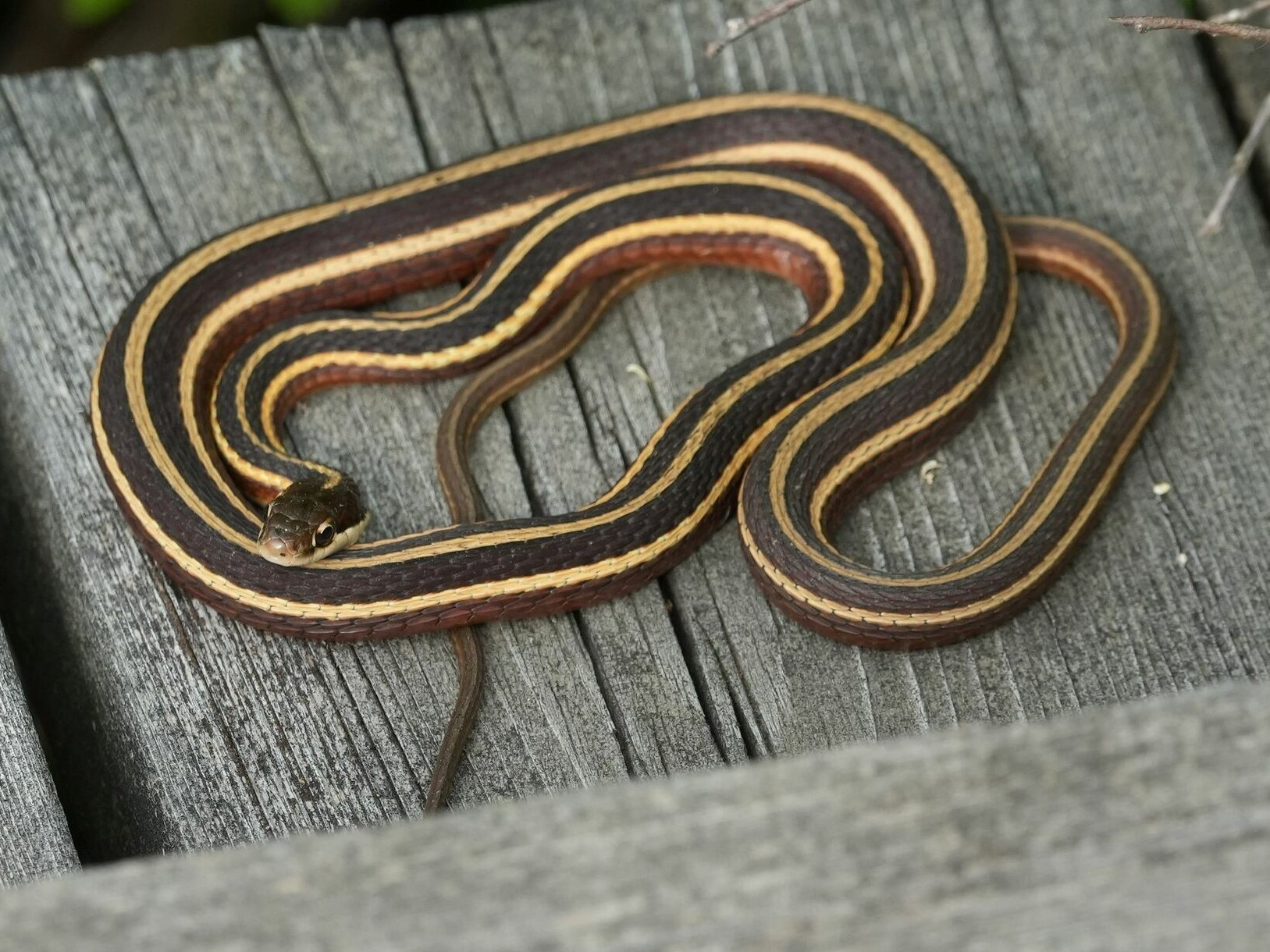

Conservation status
- Least Concern (IUCN 3.1)

Scientific classification
- Kingdom: Animalia
- Phylum: Chordata
- Class: Reptilia
- Order: Squamata
- Suborder: Serpentes
- Family: Colubridae
- Genus: Thamnophis
- Species: T. saurita
- Subspecies: T. s. septentrionalis

Trinomial name
- Thamnophis saurita septentrionalis Rossman, 1963

= Thamnophis saurita septentrionalis =

Northern ribbon snake

Subspecies of snake

Thamnophis saurita septentrionalis, the northern ribbon snake, is a subspecies of garter snake. It is one of four subspecies of the ribbon snake (Thamnophis saurita) and occurs in the United States and Canada in southern Maine, southern Ontario, Michigan, New York, southwestern Nova Scotia, northern Ohio, Illinois, and Indiana. It is listed as a state endangered species in Wisconsin. The Atlantic Canadian population (limited to southern Nova Scotia) is listed as a species at risk both federally (under the Species at Risk Act) and provincially. It is a slender black or brown snake with three bright-yellow or white stripes on its back and sides. The head is black, with the scales alongside the mouth being white. The underside is also white or light yellow, but it is mostly white on juveniles and adults. Adult ribbon snakes are 45–65 cm (18–26 in) in length.

Ribbon snakes inhabit marshes or live near the edges of lakes, ponds, and streams. They swim well, and their diets include frogs, tadpoles, salamanders, small fish, and insects.

Northern ribbon snakes have from 3 to 26 young, which are born in late summer. The young snakes are 7 to 9 inches (18 to 23 cm) long and are colored the same as the adults. As with most garter snakes, the mother gives birth to live young (ovoviviparous).
