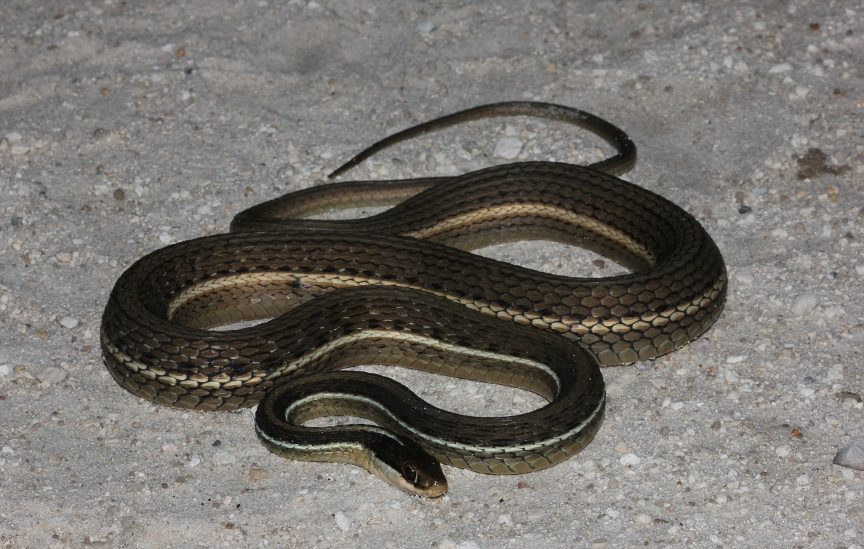

Scientific classification
- Kingdom: Animalia
- Phylum: Chordata
- Class: Reptilia
- Order: Squamata
- Suborder: Serpentes
- Family: Colubridae
- Genus: Thamnophis
- Species: T. saurita
- Subspecies: T. s. sackenii

Trinomial name
- Thamnophis saurita sackenii (Kennicott, 1859)

Synonyms
- Eutaenia sackenii Kennicott, 1859; Thamnophis sackenii — Lönnberg, 1894; Thamnophis sauritus sackenii — Conant & Bridges, 1939; Thamnophis saurita sackenii — Kraus & Cameron, 2016

= Southern ribbon snake =

Subspecies of snake

The southern ribbon snake (Thamnophis saurita sackenii), also known commonly as the peninsula ribbon snake and the Florida ribbon snake, is a subspecies of garter snake in the subfamily Natricinae of the family Colubridae. The subspecies is native to the southeastern United States, and is one of four subspecies of the ribbon snake (Thamnophis saurita).

== Etymology ==
The subspecific name, sackenii, is in honor of Russian entomologist Carl Robert Romanovich von der Osten-Sacken.

== Geographic distribution ==
The southern ribbon snake occurs in the southeastern United States in extreme southern South Carolina, southeastern Georgia, and peninsular Florida, at elevations from sea level to 500 feet (150 meters).

== Description ==
Thamnophis saurita sackenii is smaller than the other three subspecies of T. saurita. Adults of T. s. sackenii are 16–30 in (41–76 cm) in total length (tail included). The dorsal color is greenish olive, or blackish in old specimens. It has a dorsal stripe that is vetiver green or light olive-gray bordered on either side with black, and the lateral stripes are marguerite yellow.

== Habitat and behavior ==
The southern ribbon snake is found in marshes, lakes, ponds, and streams. It is semi-aquatic and semi-arboreal with wet meadows and thickets favorite habitats.

== Reproduction ==
Thamnophis saurita sackenii is ovoviviparous. Litter size is small, numbering only 5–12 newborns.
