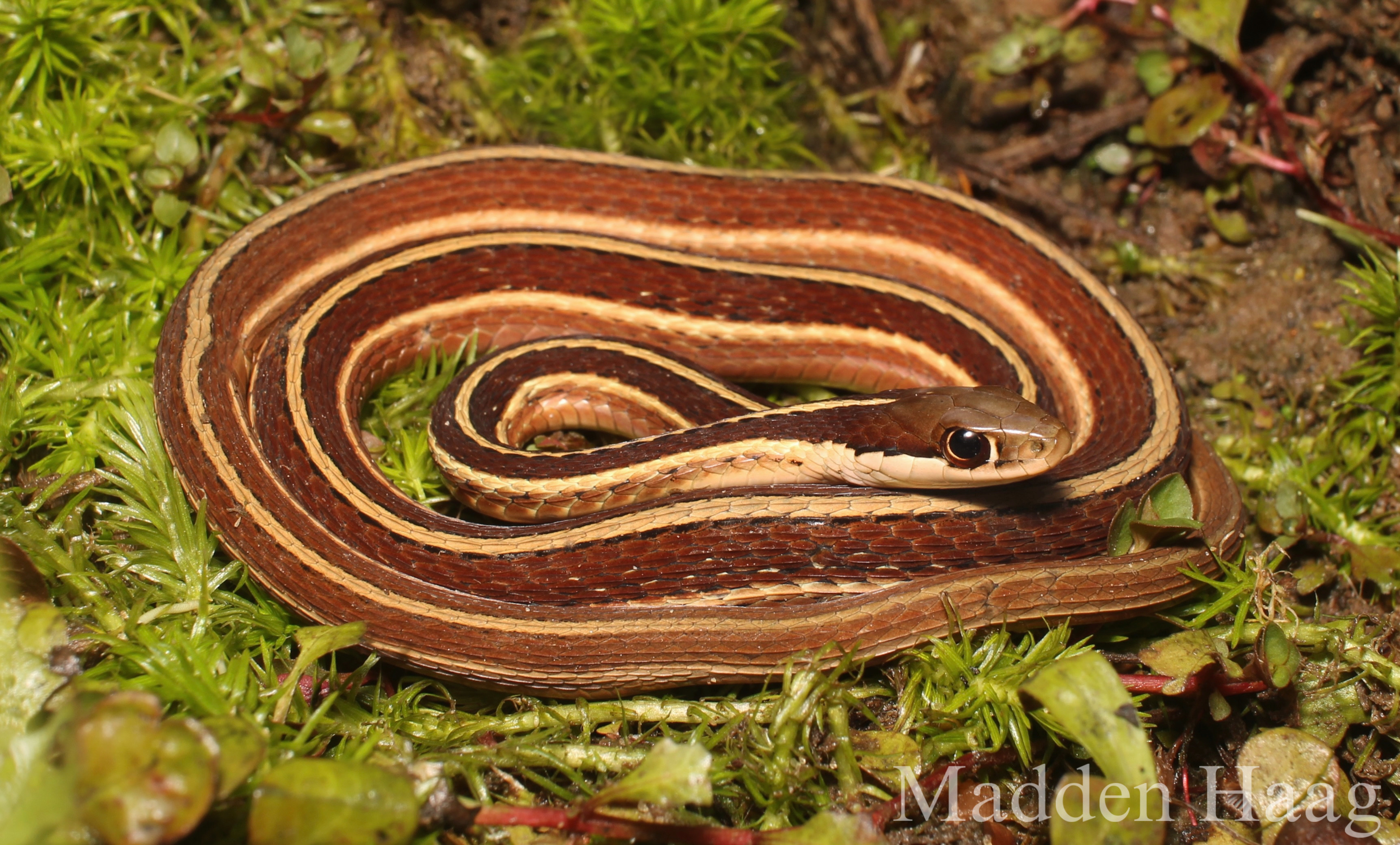
- Eastern ribbon snake (Thamnophis saurita)

Conservation status
- Least Concern (IUCN 3.1)

Scientific classification
- Kingdom: Animalia
- Phylum: Chordata
- Class: Reptilia
- Order: Squamata
- Suborder: Serpentes
- Family: Colubridae
- Genus: Thamnophis
- Species: T. saurita

Binomial name
- Thamnophis saurita (Linnaeus, 1766)

Subspecies
- Four, see text
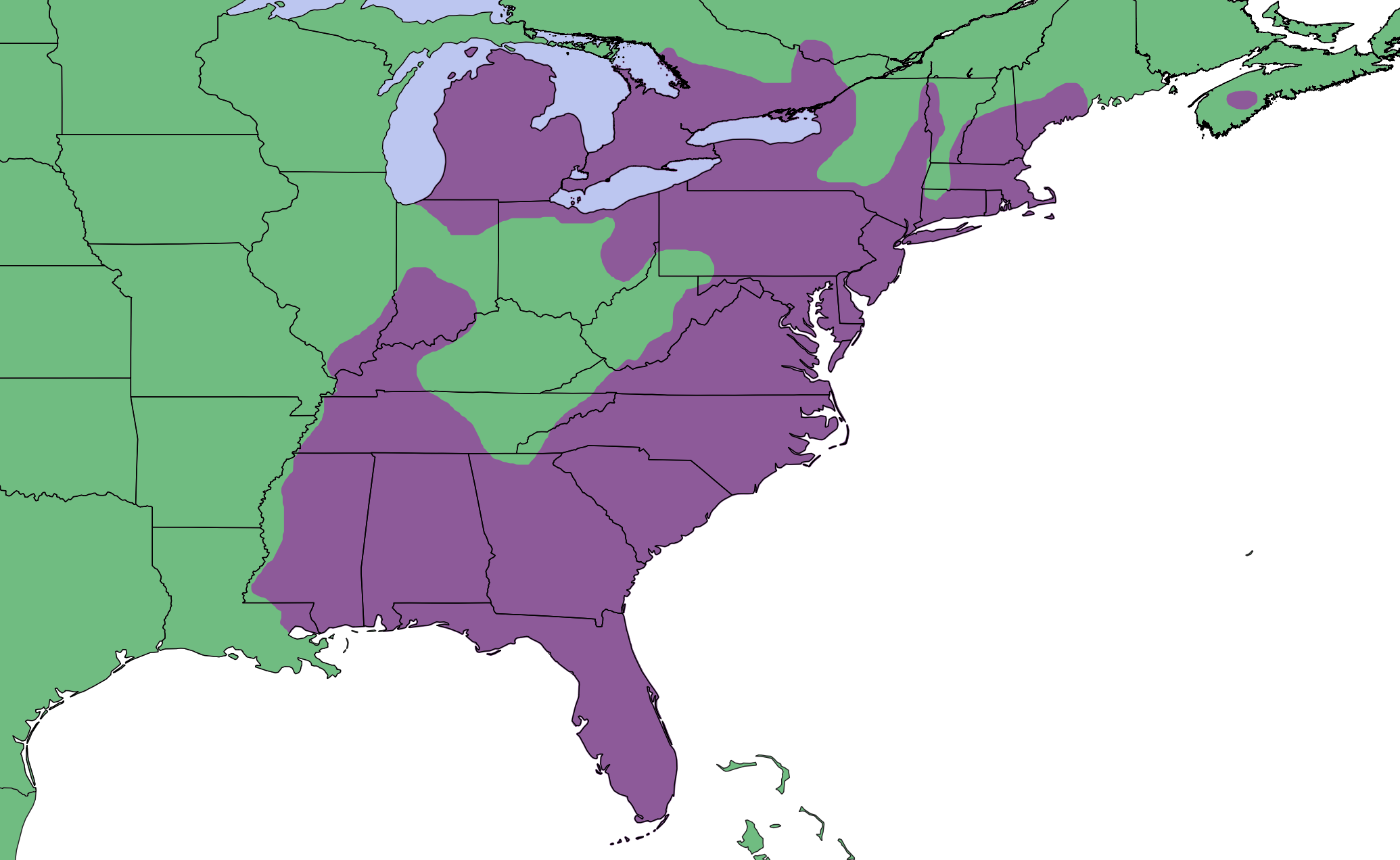

Synonyms
- List: Coluber saurita Linnaeus, 1766; Tropidonotus saurita — F. Boie, 1827; Leptophis sauritus — Holbrook, 1842; Eutaenia saurita — Baird & Girard, 1853; Prymnomiodon chalceus Cope, 1861; Thamnophis sauritus — Ruthven, 1908; Thamnophis saurita — Kraus & Cameron, 2016

= Thamnophis saurita =

Species of snake

Thamnophis saurita, also known as the eastern ribbon snake (Note: Used as a species-level common name. Not to be confused with the subspecies of the same name.), common ribbon snake, or simply ribbon snake, is a common species of garter snake native to Eastern North America. It is a non-venomous species of snake in the subfamily Natricinae of the family Colubridae. The ribbon snake averages 16 to 35 inches (41 to 89 cm) in total length (including tail). It is dark brown with bright yellow stripes. The ribbon snake is not sexually dimorphic; however, females are normally thicker than their male counterparts.

The ribbon snake can be found in wet climates such as lakes, streams, ponds and marshes. The ribbon snake is active from April to October and hibernates during the winter months. Maturity is reached around 3 years of age.

== Subspecies ==
The following four subspecies of ribbon snake are recognized as being valid:

- Eastern ribbon snake – T. s. saurita (Linnaeus, 1766) – brown body with three distinctive stripes, typically yellow, one down the middle of the back and one down each side, that alternate with the brown body. Ranges from New York to Florida, west to the Mississippi River.
- Northern ribbon snake – T. s. septentrionalis Rossman, 1963 – dark brown/black with yellow line down its back and often its sides; ranges from Maine through Ontario and Indiana.
- Southern ribbon snake or peninsula ribbon snake – T. s. sackenii (Kennicott, 1859) – tan or brown; ranges from South Carolina south through Florida.
- Bluestripe ribbon snake – T. s. nitae Rossman, 1963 – dark with light blue lateral stripes; Gulf Coast of north-central Florida.

Nota bene: A trinomial authority in parentheses indicates that the subspecies was originally described in a genus other than Thamnophis.

== Habitat ==
Ribbon snakes are semi-aquatic and are seldom found far from water. This species can be seen basking or resting along ponds, streams, swamps, and wet woodlands or grasslands. Shallow water is exploited both as hunting grounds and an escape route from predators. Overwintering sites are typically underground at higher elevations, such as under rock piles.

== Prey and predators ==
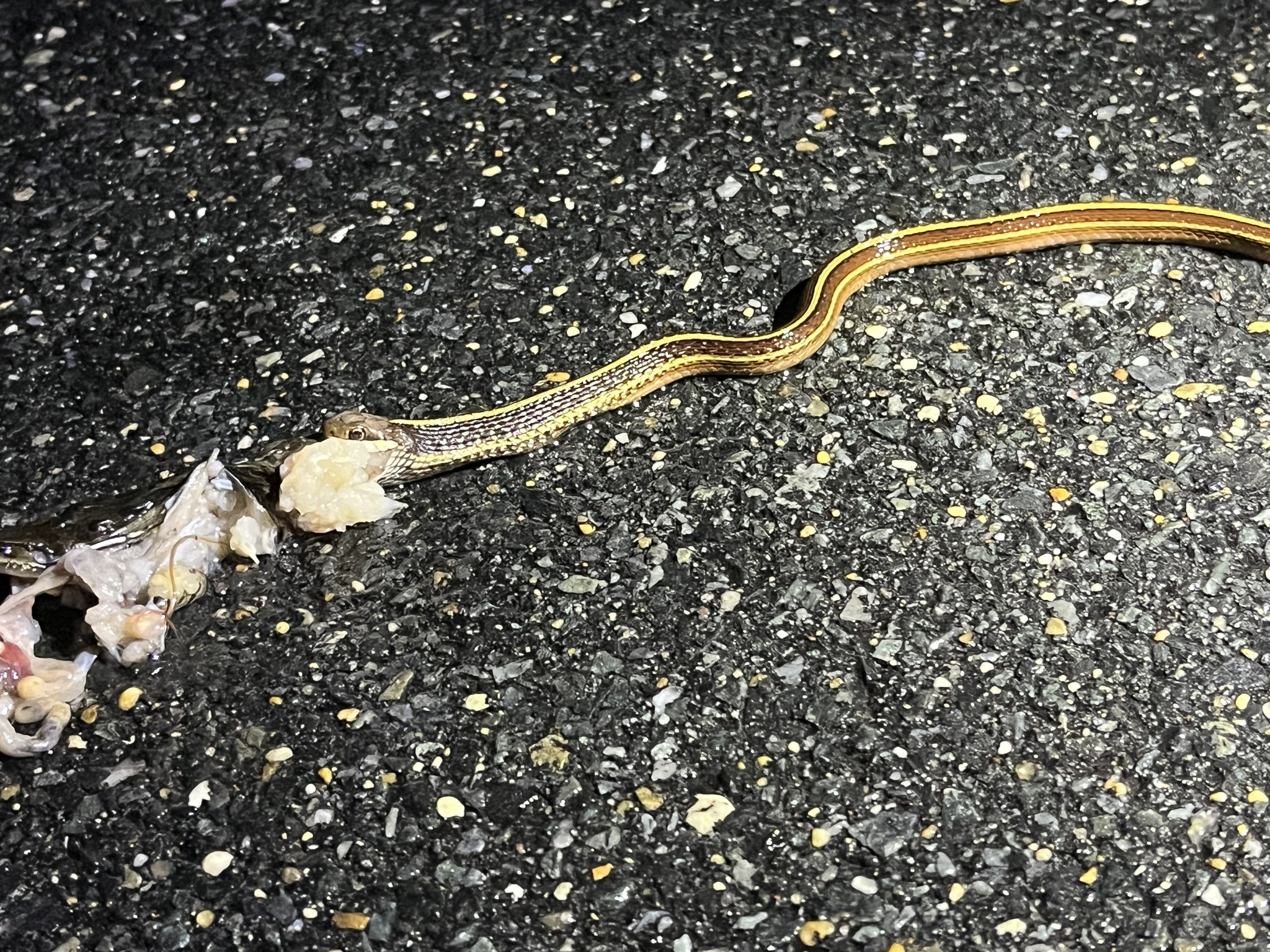
Feeding on a road-killed southern leopard frog, in North Carolina

In order to hunt, ribbon snakes use a few of their senses including auditory and visual perception. Ribbon snakes do not eat warm-blooded prey, just as garter snakes, also of the genus Thamnophis, do not. Using their auditory and visual traits, they are able to prey upon newts, salamanders, frogs, toads, tadpoles, small fish, spiders, and earthworms. Meanwhile, they fall prey to mammals, birds, and larger amphibians and reptiles. Ribbon snakes rarely use any aggressive form of defense. Instead, they use their brown bodies to camouflage with the surrounding vegetation. Along with this, they flee and hide in dense patches of grass in which they will coil up and get as low to the ground as possible. Given that snakes consume their prey whole, small individuals are particularly constrained in the size and shape of prey that can be consumed. These smaller snakes compensate for their smaller body size by having larger heads.

== Reproduction ==
Beginning in the spring, after hibernation, ribbon snakes begin to look for another snake with which to mate. Ribbon snakes are ovoviviparous snakes, meaning they give birth to live young. The live young tend to be born in the summer, in litters of 4 to 27 snakes. Ribbon snakes tend to mature after two to three years, which is when they will be able to start breeding. Ribbon snakes tend to breed once or twice each year after they mature.
