= Douglas A. Rossman =

American herpetologist (1936–2015)

Dr. Douglas Rossman
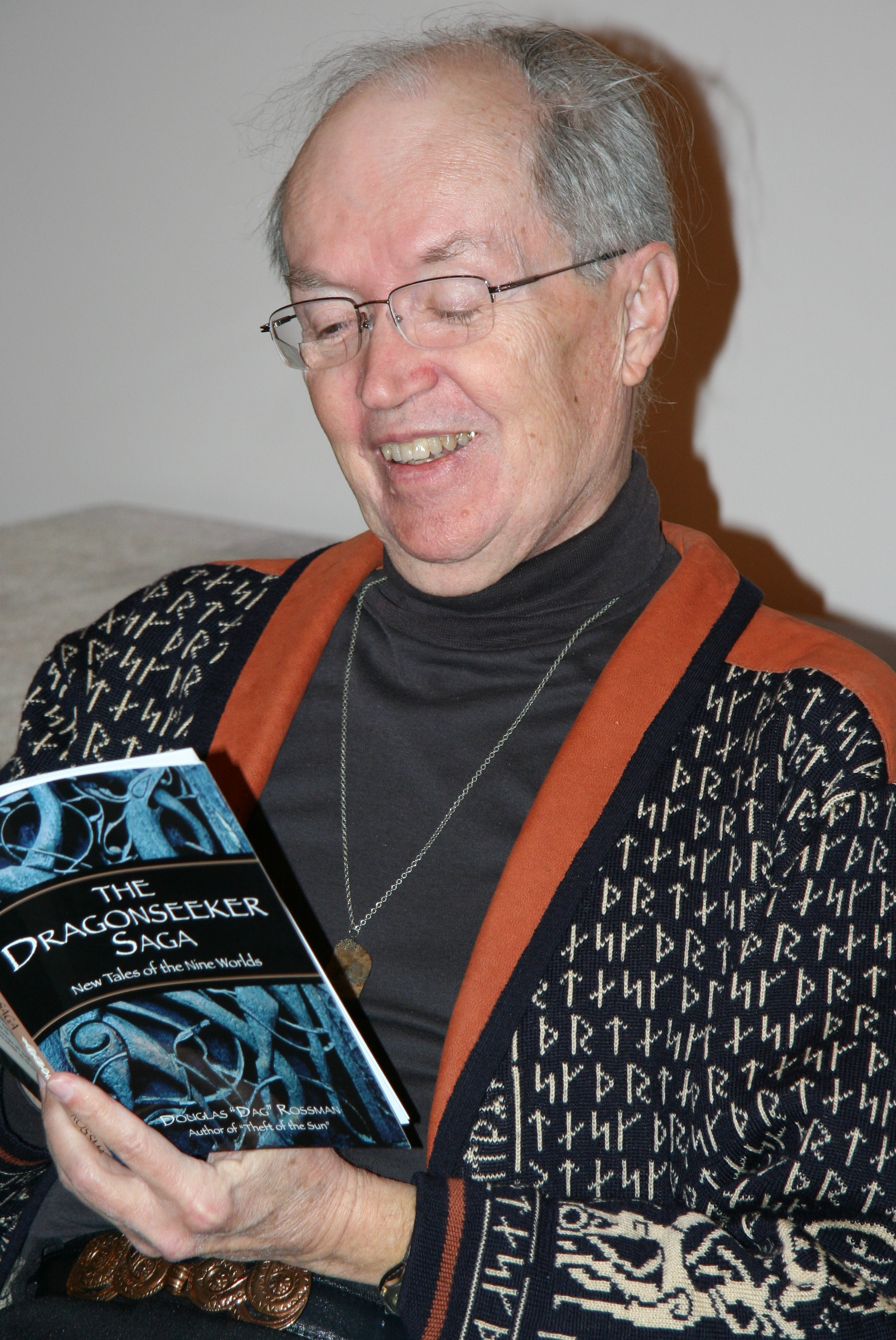
- Rossman reading in 2009 at the Vesterheim Norwegian-American Museum
- Died: July 23, 2015 (aged 79)
- Education: University of Florida
- Known for: His research pertaining to snakes
- Scientific career
- Fields: Zoology
- Workplaces: Louisiana State University

Douglas Athon "Dag" Rossman (July 4, 1936 – July 23, 2015) was a U.S. herpetologist specializing in garter snakes. He studied at the University of Florida, where he was awarded a Ph.D. in 1961.

He was a professor of zoology at the Louisiana State University in Baton Rouge, Louisiana.

He co-authored The Amphibians and Reptiles of Louisiana (ISBN 0-8071-2077-4), and also The Garter Snakes: Evolution and Ecology (ISBN 0-8061-2820-8).

His wife, Nita Jane Rossman (born 1936), also has an interest in herpetology and even had a subspecies named after her: Thamnophis saurita nitae, a subspecies of the eastern ribbon snake. She had collected the holotype for this subspecies on a field trip with her husband for his dissertation research, and he named it in her honor.

Rossman also wrote The Nine Worlds: A Dictionary of Norse Mythology (1983), Where Legends Live: A Pictorial Guide to Cherokee Mythic Places (1988), and several other works related to Norse mythology.

Douglas Rossman is commemorated in the scientific name of a species of Mexican garter snake, Thamnophis rossmani.
