= Lists of reptiles =

The following are the regional reptiles lists by continent.

== Africa ==
- Africa
- Canary Islands
- Democratic Republic of the Congo
- Egypt
- Ghana
- Lesotho
- Madagascar
- Morocco
- Togo

== Asia ==
- South Asia
- Korean Peninsula
- Afghanistan
- China
- India
  - Andaman and Nicobar Islands
  - Telangana
  - Mizoram
  - Kaziranga National Park
- Nepal
- Iran
- Israel
- Lebanon
- Mongolia
- Pakistan
- Sri Lanka
- Singapore
- Turkey

== Europe ==
- Europe
- Aegean
- Bulgaria
- Cyprus
- Finland
- France
- Great Britain
- Ireland
- Italy
- Latvia
- Poland
- Portugal
- Spain
- Sweden
- Gibraltar

== North America ==
=== United States ===
- United States
- Alabama
- Alaska
- Arizona
- Arkansas
- California
- Colorado
- Florida
- Georgia
- Idaho
- Indiana
- Iowa
- Kansas
- Massachusetts
- Michigan
- Minnesota
- Missouri
- Montana
- Nebraska
- New Jersey
- North Carolina
- Oklahoma
- Oregon
- Pennsylvania
- South Carolina
- South Dakota
- Texas
- Vermont
- Virginia
- Washington
- West Virginia
- Wisconsin
- Wyoming

=== Caribbean ===
- Anguilla
- Antigua and Barbuda
- Barbados
- Cuba
- Dominica
- Grenada
- Grenadines
- Guadeloupe
- Martinique
- Montserrat
- Puerto Rico
- Saba
- Saint Barthélemy
- Saint Kitts and Nevis
- Saint Lucia
- Saint Martin
- Saint Vincent
- Sint Eustatius

=== Other ===
- American Samoa
- Canada
  - Quebec
- Costa Rica
- Guatemala
- Northern America
- Olympic National Park
- Yellowstone National Park

== Oceania ==
- Australia
  - Tasmania
  - Western Australia
    - Houtman Abrolhos
    - Recherche Archipelago

== South America ==
- Brazil
- Colombia

== See also ==
- Herpetology
