= List of reptiles of Cyprus =

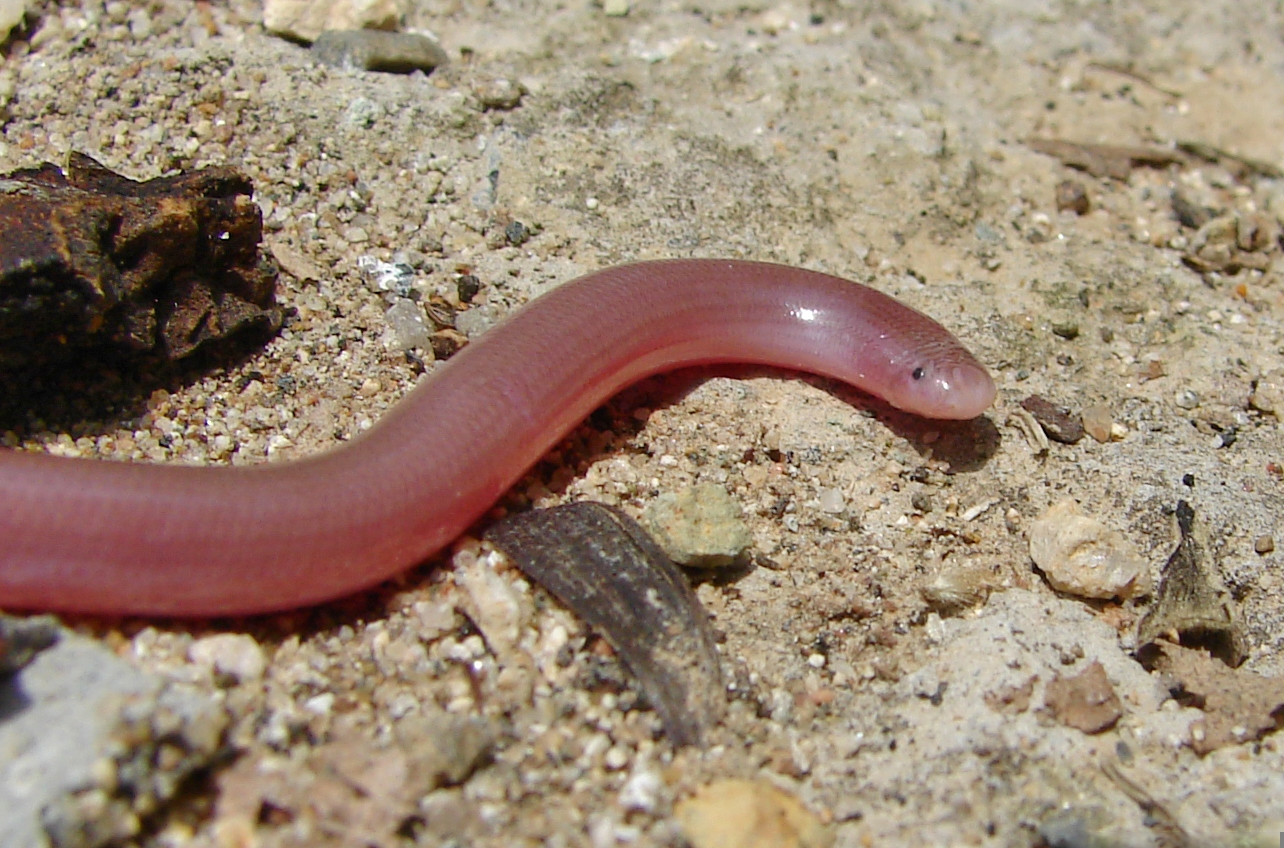
Typhlops vermicularis

There are several species of reptiles in Cyprus including venomous and non-venomous snakes, lizards and turtles.

== Lizards ==
Family: Agamidae

- Cyprus rock agama, Laudakia cypriaca (Daan, 1967)

Family: Chamaeleontida

- Mediterranean chameleon, Chamaeleo chamaeleon (Linnaeus, 1758)

Family: Gekkonidae

- Kotschy's gecko, Cyrtopodion kotschyi (Steindachner, 1870)
- Mediterranean house gecko, Hemidactylus turcicus (Linnaeus, 1758)

Family: Lacertidae

- Schreiber's fringe-fingered lizard, Acanthodactylus schreiberi (Boettger, 1878)
- Snake-eyed lizard, Ophisops elegans (Ménétriés, 1832)
- Troodos lizard, Phoenicolacerta troodica (Werner, 1936)

Family: Scincidae

- Budak's snake-eyed skink, Ablepharus budaki (Göçmen, Kumlutas & Tosunoglu, 1996)
- Eyed skink, Chalcides ocellatus (Forsskål, 1775)
- Schneider's skink, Eumeces schneiderii (Daudin, 1802)
- Bridled mabuya, Mabuya vittata (Olivier, 1804)

== Snakes ==
Family: Colubridae

- Large whip snake, Dolichophis jugularis (Linnaeus, 1758)
- Dwarf snake, Eirenis modestus (Martin, 1838)
- Cyprus whip snake, Hierophis cypriensis (Schätti, 1985)
- Coin snake, Hemorrhois nummifer (Reuss, 1834)
- Montpelier snake, Malpolon monspessulanus insignitus (Geoffroy Saint-Hilaire, 1827)
- Cyprus grass snake, Natrix natrix cypriaca (Hecht, 1930)
- Dahl's whip snake, Platyceps najadum dahli (Linnaeus, 1758)
- Cat snake, Telescopus fallax cyprianus (Barbour & Amaral, 1927)

Family: Typhlopidae

- Worm snake, Typhlops vermicularis (Merrem, 1820)

Family: Viperidae

- Cyprian blunt-nosed viper, Macrovipera lebetina lebetina (Linnaeus, 1758)

== Turtles ==
Family: Cheloniidae

- Loggerhead sea turtle, Caretta caretta (Linnaeus, 1758)
- Green sea turtle, Chelonia mydas (Linnaeus, 1758)

Family: Geoemydidae

- Western Caspian turtle, Mauremys caspica rivulata (Valenciennes, 1833)

== See also ==
- Lists of reptiles by region
