= List of reptiles of Great Britain =

The reptiles of Great Britain include three native snakes and three native lizards. A number of sea turtles visit Great Britain's shores. There are also at least seven introduced reptile species.

== Snakes (Serpentes) ==
Image	Name	Head (dorsal)	Head (lateral)	Distribution
	Common adder (Vipera berus)			
	Barred grass snake (Natrix helvetica) (Note: Previously referred to as Natrix natrix helvetica.)			
	Smooth snake (Coronella austriaca)			

== Lizards (Lacertilia) ==
Image	Name	Distribution
	Slow worm (Anguis fragilis)	
	Viviparous lizard (Zootoca vivipara)	
	Sand lizard (Lacerta agilis)	

== Sea turtles (Chelonioidea) ==
Image	Name	Distribution	
	Leatherback sea turtle (Dermochelys coriacea)		Foraging
	Loggerhead sea turtle (Caretta caretta)		Vagrant
	Green sea turtle (Chelonia mydas)		Vagrant
	Hawksbill sea turtle (Eretmochelys imbricata)		Vagrant
	Kemp's ridley sea turtle (Lepidochelys kempii)		Vagrant
	Olive ridley sea turtle (Lepidochelys olivacea)		Vagrant

== Pond turtles (Emydidae) ==
Image	Name	Distribution	
	European pond turtle (Emys orbicularis)		Extirpated - currently extinct in Britain but the rewilding organisation, Celtic Rewilding, aims to reintroduce them by 2026.

== Introduced species ==
- Red-eared slider, Trachemys scripta elegans
- Mediterranean house gecko, Hemidactylus turcicus
- Common wall lizard, Podarcis muralis
- Italian wall lizard, Podarcis siculus
- Western green lizard, Lacerta bilineata - possible extirpated native
- Aesculapian snake, Zamenis longissimus – former native (Pleistocene)
- Grass snake, Natrix natrix
- Note that a variety of other freshwater turtles have been introduced to the UK.

== See also ==
- Introduced species of the British Isles
- Lists of reptiles by region
