= List of amphibians and reptiles of Olympic National Park =

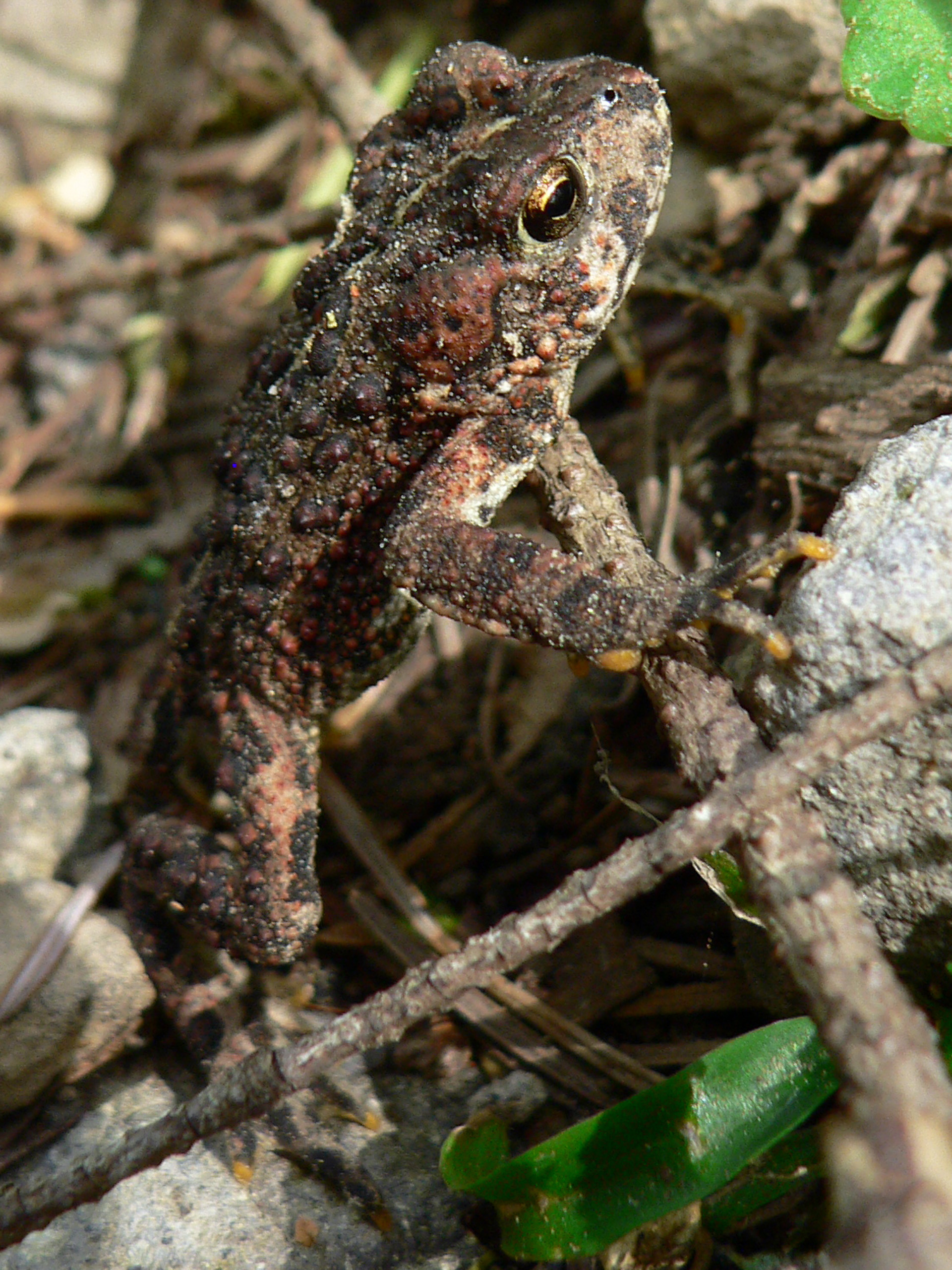
Western toad

Olympic National Park is home to 13 amphibian species and four species of reptiles. Olympic National Park amphibians and reptiles are a subset of Washington state amphibians and reptiles as listed in the Burke Museum of Natural History and Culture, University of Washington, Field Guides.

== Amphibians ==
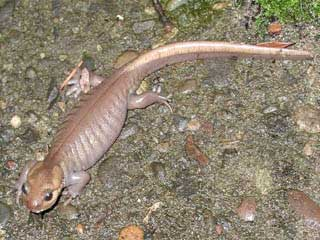
Northwestern salamander

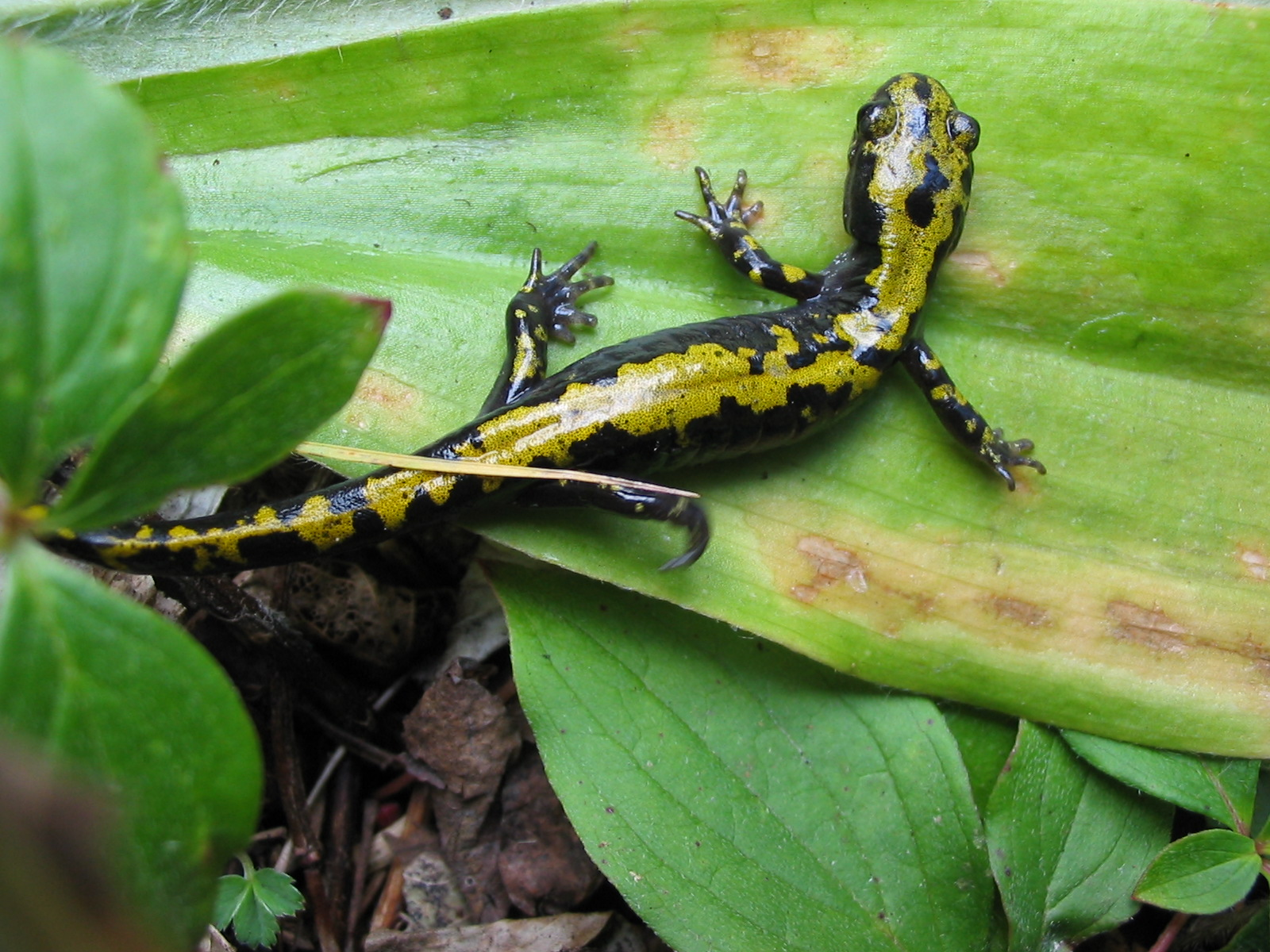
Long-toed salamander

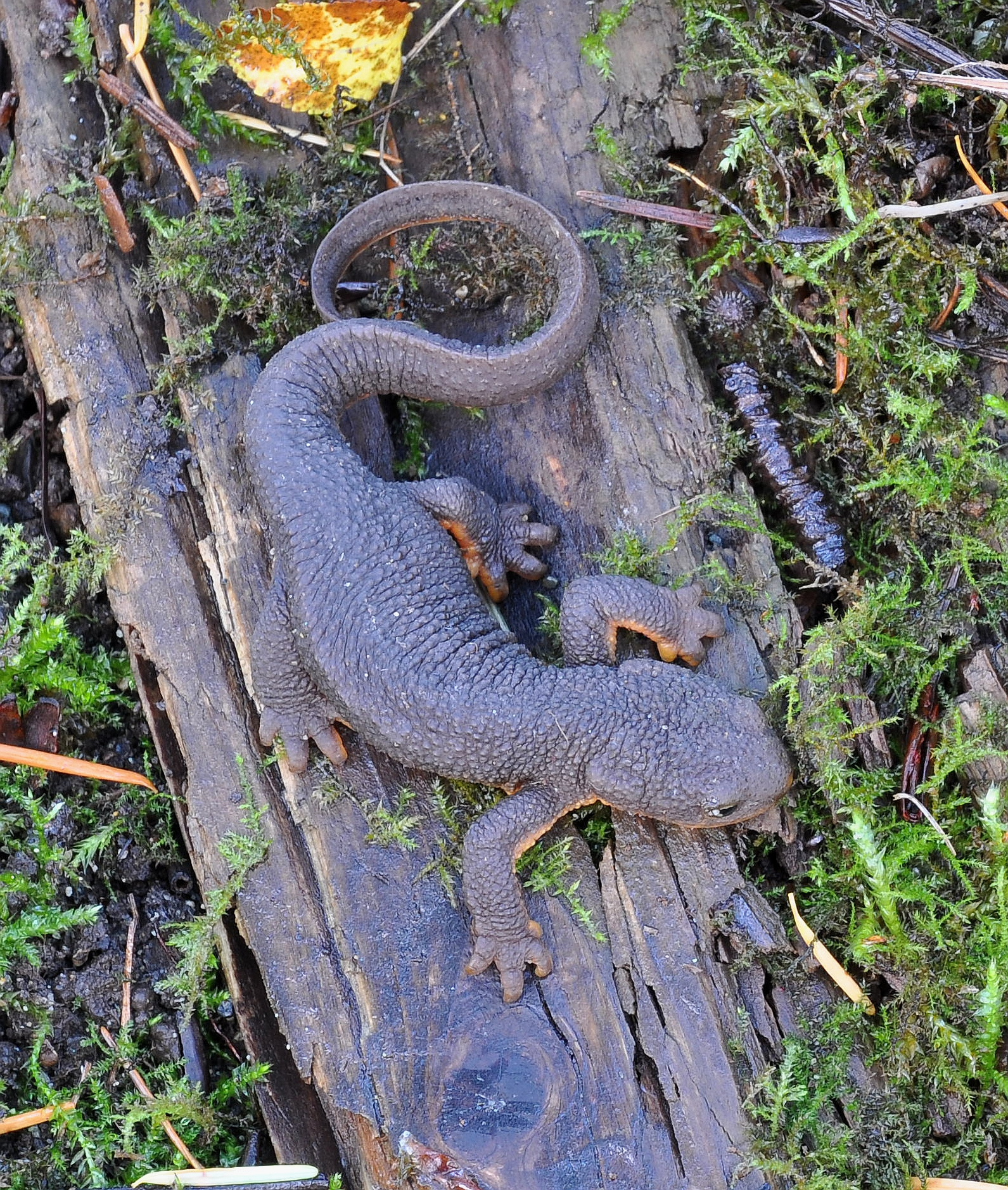
Rough-skinned newt

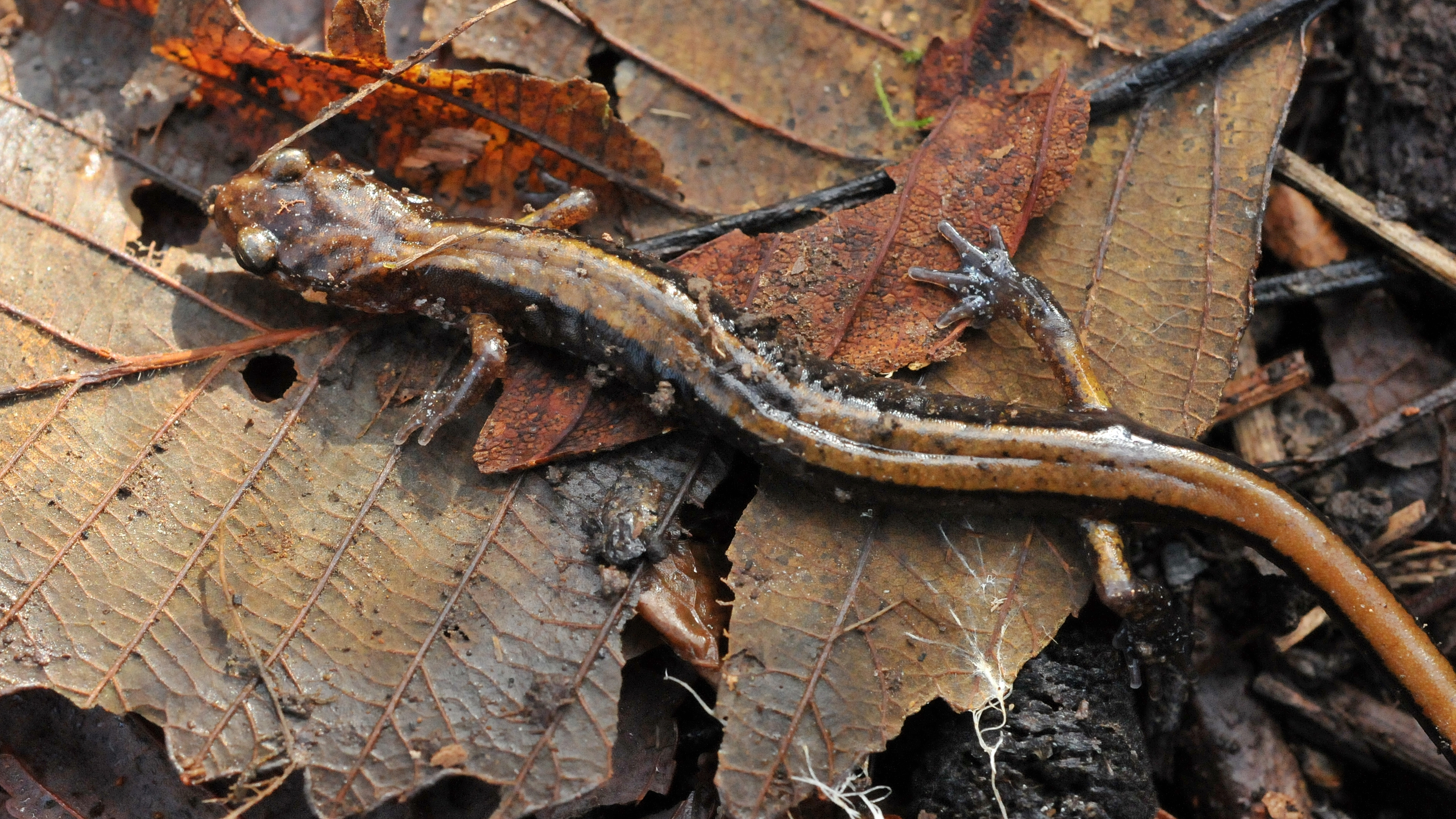
Western redback salamander

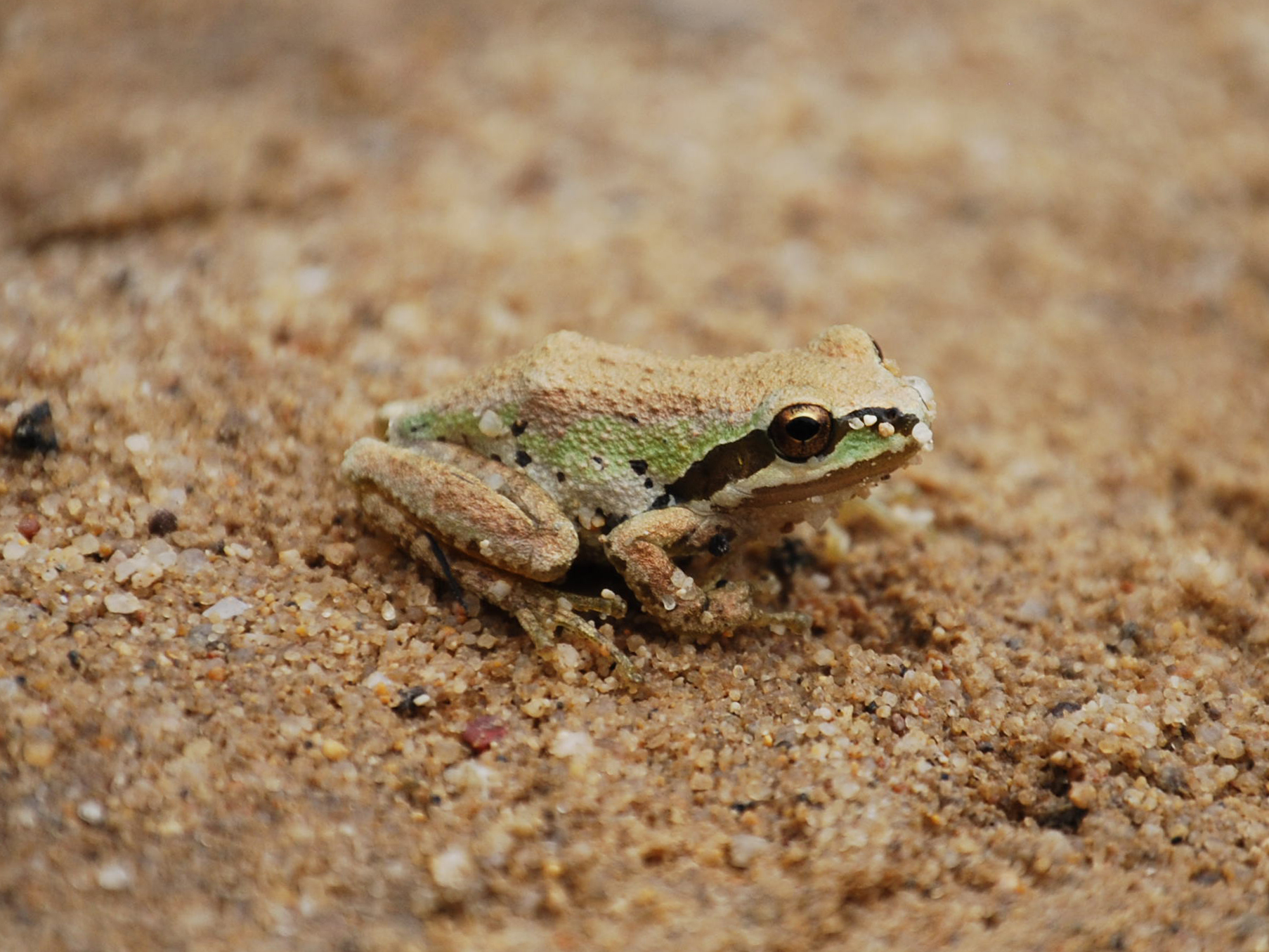
Pacific tree frog

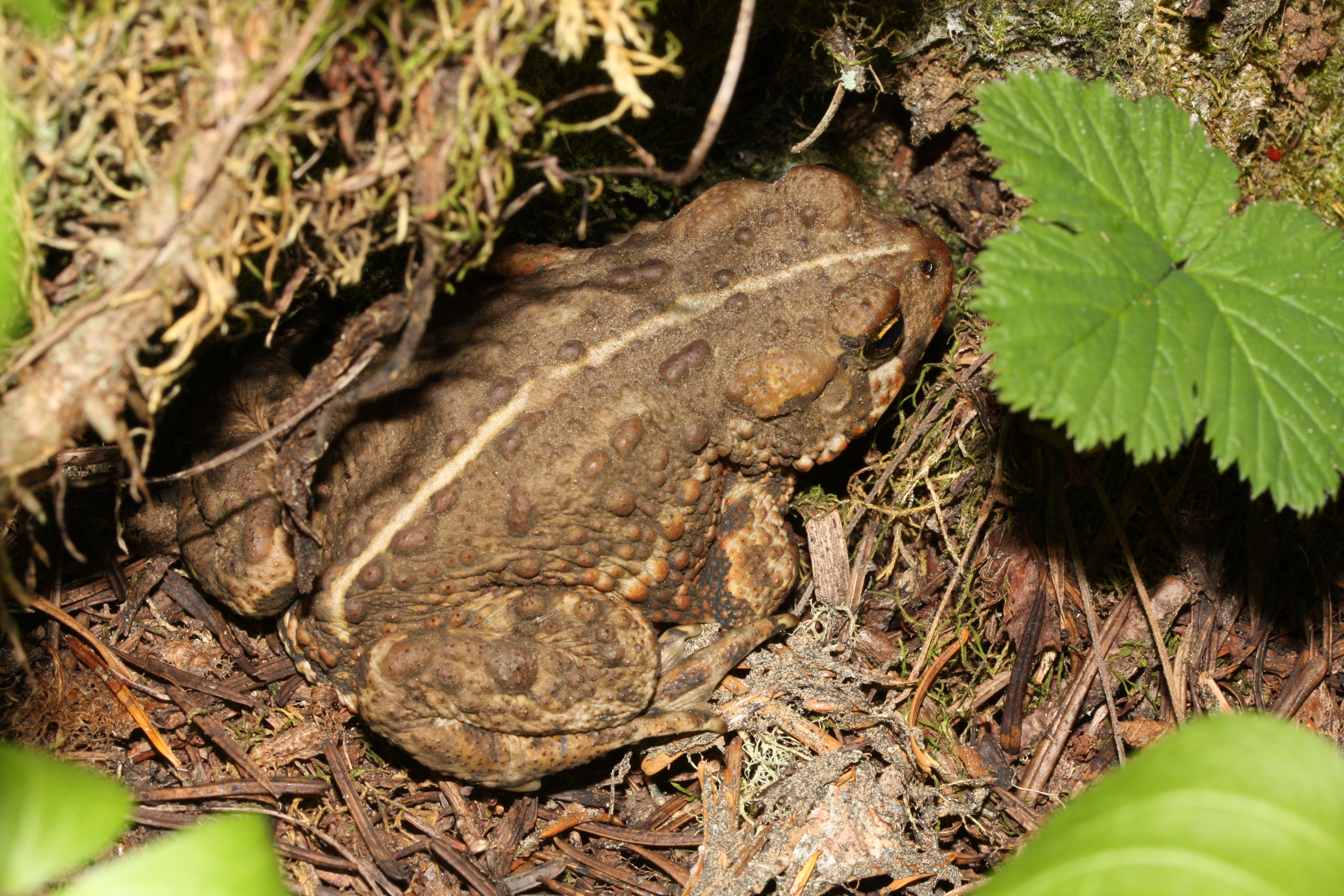
Western toad

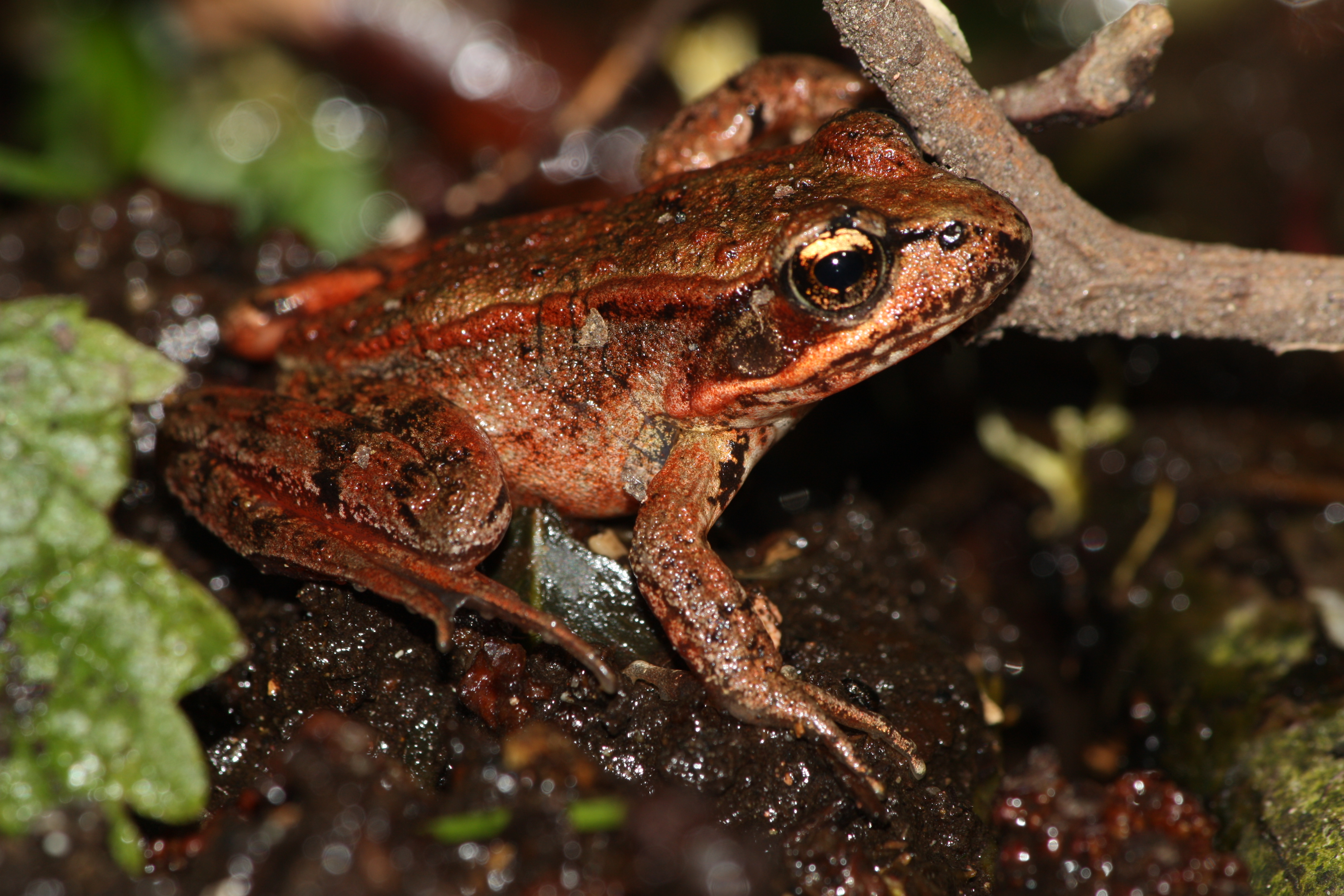
Northern red-legged frog

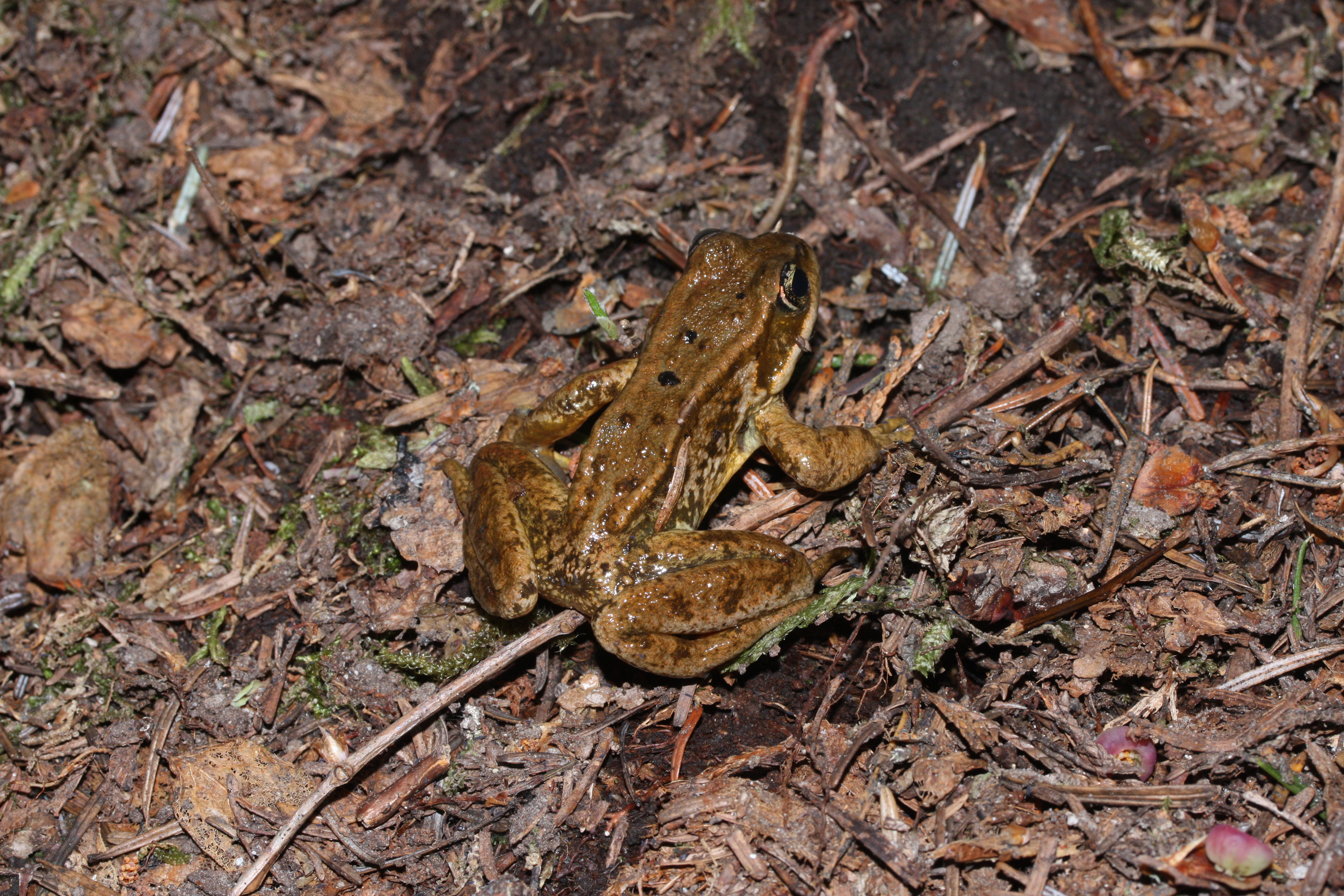
Cascade frog

=== Northwestern salamander ===
The northwestern salamander (Ambystoma gracile) inhabits the northwest Pacific coast of North America. These fairly large salamanders grow to 8.7 in (220 mm) in length. It is found from southeastern Alaska on May Island, through Washington and Oregon south to the mouth of the Gulala River, Sonoma County, California. It occurs from sea level to timberline, but not east of the Cascade Divide.

=== Long-toed salamander ===
The long-toed salamander (Ambystoma macrodactylum, Baird 1849) is a mole salamander in the family Ambystomatidae. This species, typically 4.1–8.9 cm (1 3/5 – 3 1/2 in) long when mature, is characterized by its mottled black, brown and yellow pigmentation, and its long outer fourth toe on the hind limbs. The distribution of the long-toed salamander is primarily in the Pacific Northwest, with an altitudinal range of up to 2,800 metres (9,200 ft). It lives in a variety of habitats including temperate rainforests, coniferous forests, montane riparian zones, sagebrush plains, red fir forests, semi-arid sagebrush, cheatgrass plains, and alpine meadows along the rocky shores of mountain lakes. It lives in slow-moving streams, ponds and lakes during its aquatic breeding phase. The long-toed salamander hibernates during the cold winter months, surviving on protein energy reserves stored in the skin and tail.

=== Olympic torrent salamander ===
The Olympic torrent salamander (Rhyacotriton olympicus) is a species of salamander in the family Rhyacotritonidae. It is a small salamander (up to 10 cm total length) that lives in clear, cold mountain streams. It is endemic to the United States. The Olympic torrent salamander occurs in the Olympic Mountains of Washington. Its natural habitats are temperate forests, rivers, and freshwater springs.

=== Cope's giant salamander ===
Cope's giant salamander (Dicamptodon copei) is a species of salamander in the family Dicamptodontidae. It reaches between 12.4–19.1 cm (4 7/8 – 7 1/2 in). The salamander resembles Pacific Giant Salamander larvae, but it never transforms to a terrestrial stage. It is smaller overall with a narrower head and shorter limbs. It is brown above with patches of yellowish-tan covering clusters of white skin glands, its belly is dark bluish-gray. The salamander has 12–13 inconspicuous costal grooves.

=== Rough-skinned newt ===
The rough-skinned newt (Taricha granulosa) is a newt known for its strong poison. Habitats of rough-skinned newts are found throughout the West Coast of the United States and British Columbia. Their range extends south to Santa Cruz, California and north to Alaska.

=== Oregon ensatina ===
The Oregon ensatina (Ensatina eschscholtzii oregonensis) (commonly known by its genus name, Ensatina) is a complex of plethodontid (lungless) salamanders. found in coniferous forests, oak woodland and chaparral from British Columbia, through Washington, Oregon, across California (where all seven subspecies variations are located), all the way down to Baja California in Mexico.

=== Western redback salamander ===
The western redback salamander (Plethodon vehiculum) is a species of salamander in the family Plethodontidae. It is found in Canada and the United States. Its natural habitats are temperate forests and rocky areas. Colored stripe on back changes from red to yellow.

=== Van Dyke's salamander ===
Van Dyke's Salamander (Plethodon vandykei) is a salamander in the order Caudata and the family Plethodontidae. The species is endemic to the western portion of the state of Washington, northern Idaho, and northwestern Montana in the United States. It is predominantly located in hilly or mountainous regions such as the Olympic Hills, the Willapa Hills and the Cascade Mountains.

=== Pacific tree frog ===
The Pacific tree frog (Pseudacris regilla) is a very common species of chorus frog, with a range from the West Coast of the United States (from North California, Oregon, and Washington) to British Columbia in Canada. Living anywhere from sea level up to over 10,000 feet, they are found in shades of greens or browns and even have been known to change between them. They live in many types of habitats and reproduce in aquatic settings. This species is also known as the Pacific chorus frog.

=== Coastal tailed frog ===
The tailed frogs are two species of frogs. The species are part of the genus Ascaphus, the only taxon in the family Ascaphidae /æˈskæfɪdiː/. The "tail" in the name is actually an extension of the male cloaca. The tail is one of two distinctive anatomical features adapting the species to life in fast-flowing streams. It is the only North American frog that reproduces by internal fertilization. Until 2001, the genus was believed to be monotypic, the single species being the tailed frog (Ascaphus truei Stejneger, 1899). However, in that year Nielson, Lohman, and Sullivan published evidence in Evolution that promoted the Rocky Mountain tailed frog (Ascaphus montanus) from a subspecies to its own species. Since then, the former species has been formally called coastal tailed frog.

=== Western toad ===
The western toad or boreal toad (Bufo boreas) is a large toad species, between 5.6 and 13 cm long, of western North America. It has a white or cream dorsal stripe, and is dusky gray or greenish dorsally with skin glands concentrated within the dark blotches.

=== Northern red-legged frog ===
The northern red-legged frog (Rana aurora) is a species of amphibian, whose range is the coastal region stretching from southwest British Columbia to Northern California, and is protected in British Columbia, Oregon and California.

=== Cascades frog ===
The Cascades frog (Rana cascadae) is a species of frog in the family Ranidae. It is found in western United States and possibly Canada, mainly in the Cascade Range and Olympic Mountains.

== Reptiles ==
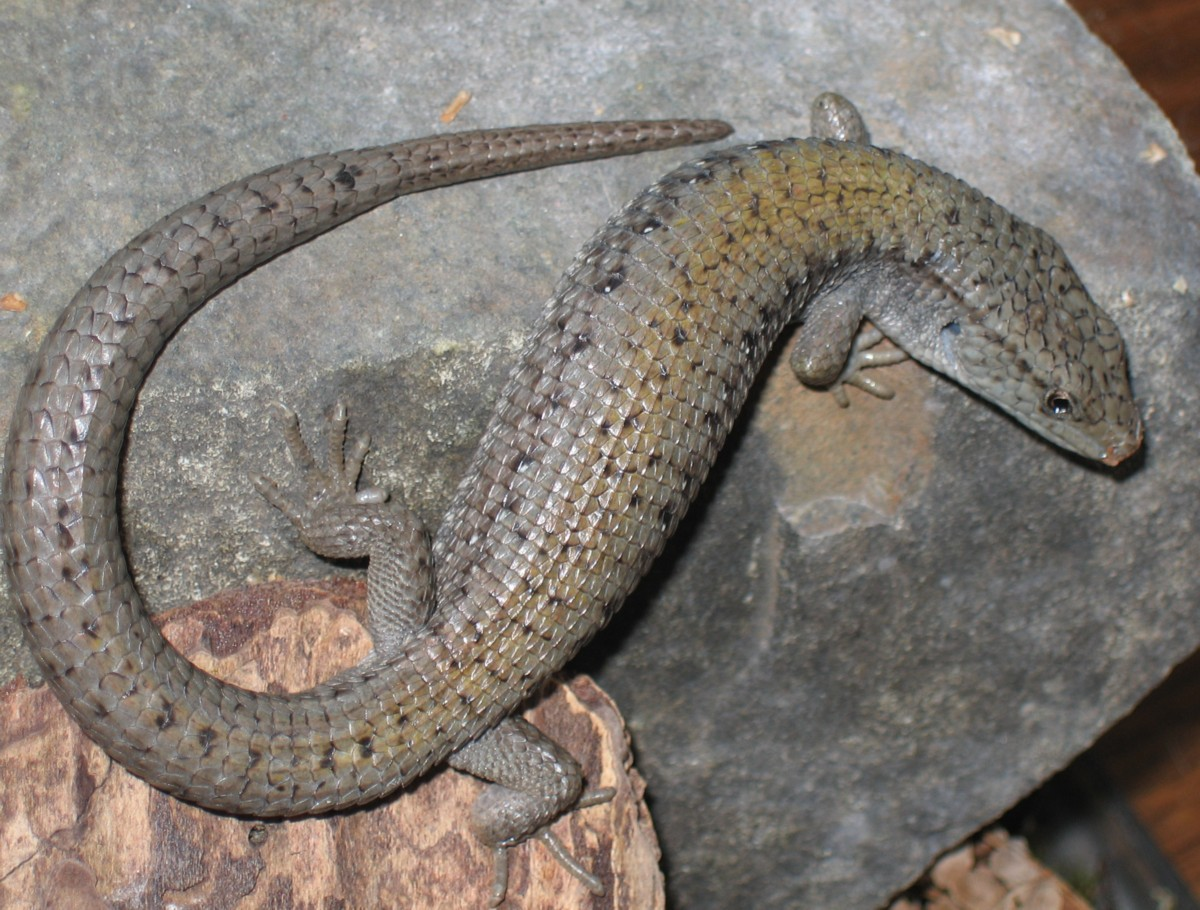
Northern alligator lizard

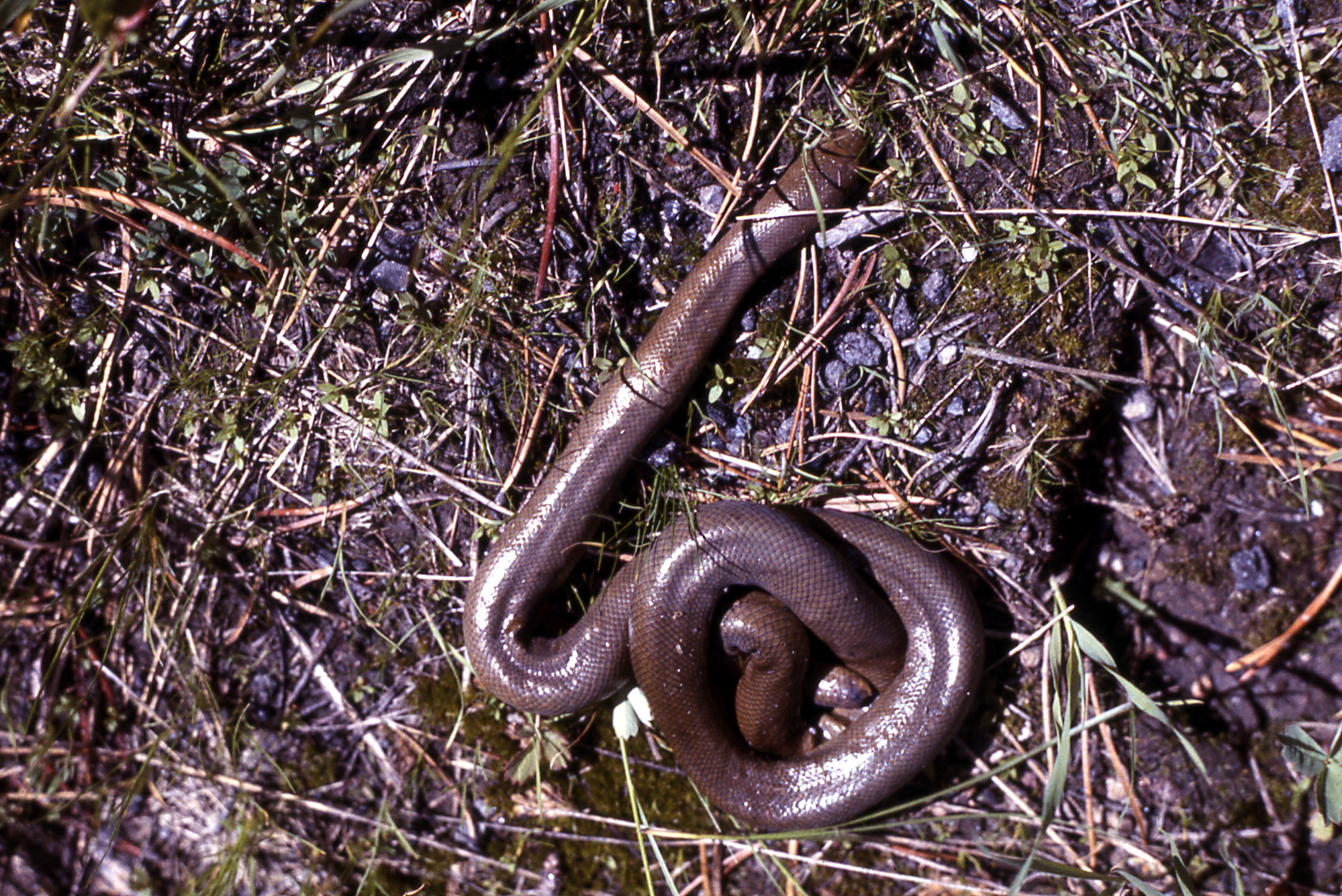
Rubber boa

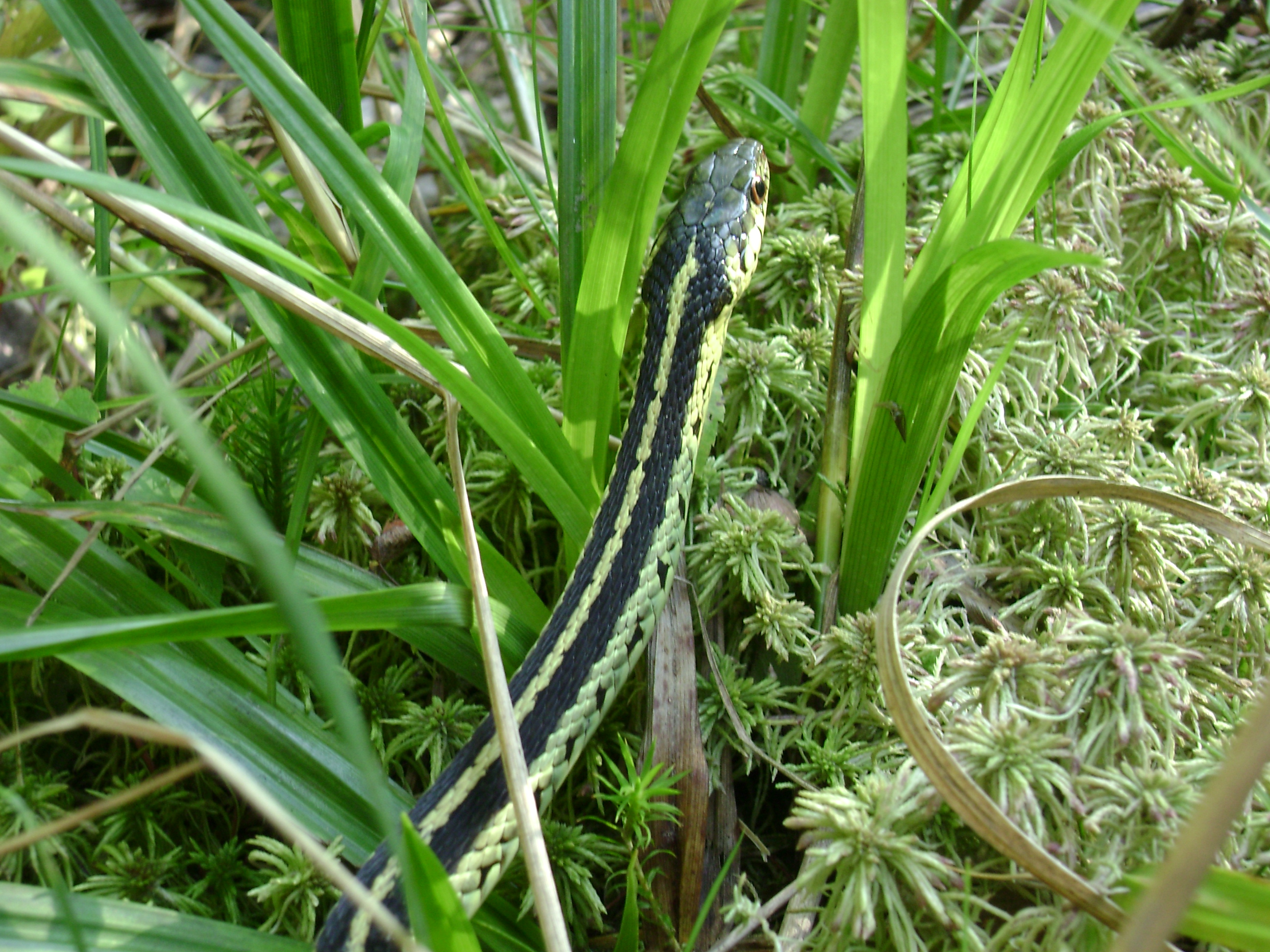
Common garter snake

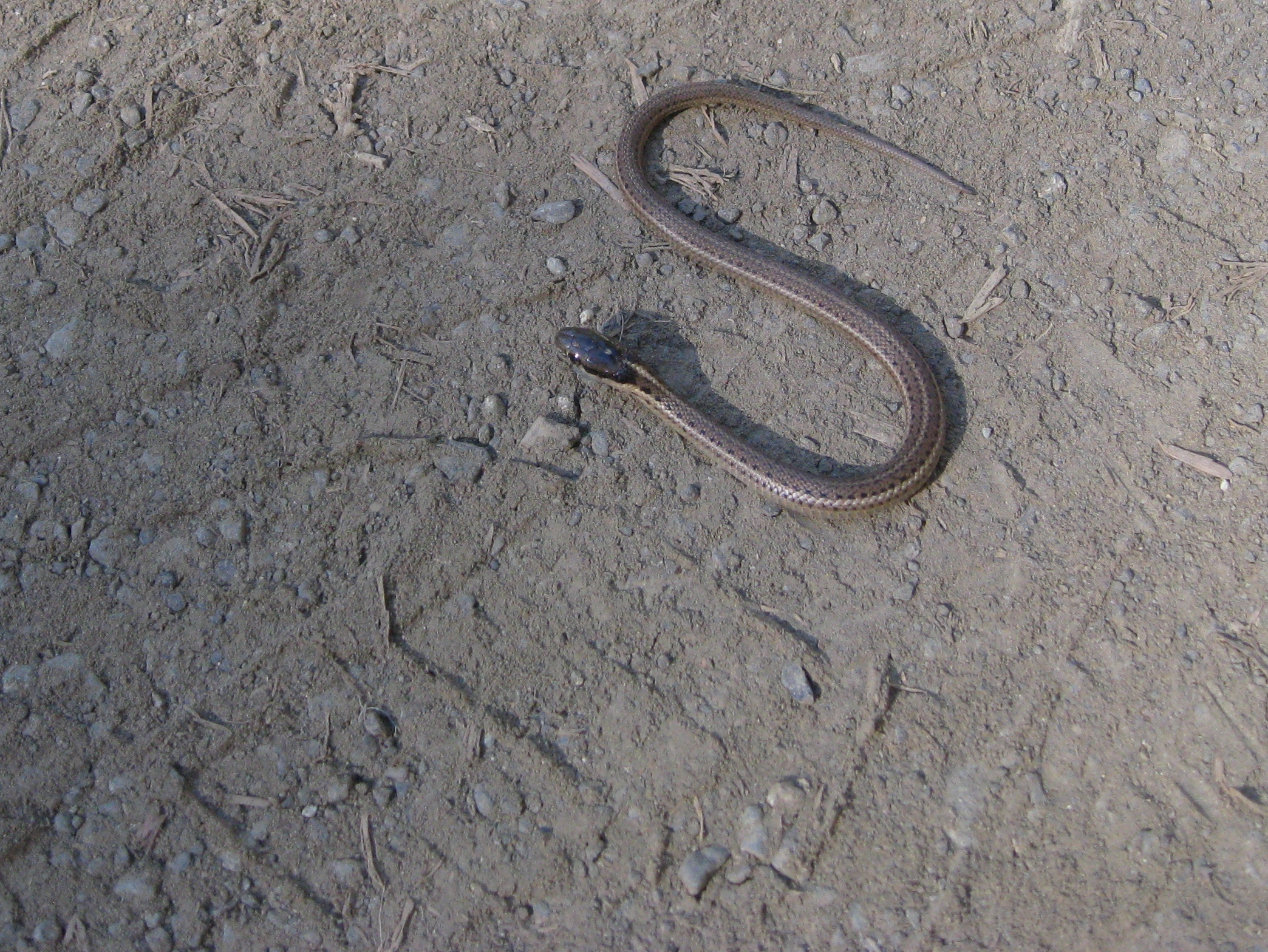
Northwestern garter snake

=== Northern alligator lizard ===
The northern alligator lizard (Elgaria coerulea) is a medium-sized lizard that occurs on the North American west coast. Northern Alligator Lizards are medium-sized slender lizards. Adults reach a snout-to-vent length of about 10 cm (4 inches) and a total length of roughly 25 cm (10 in). They have a distinct skin fold on their sides, separating the keeled scales on the back from the smooth ventral scales. They are brownish in color and often have dark blotches that sometimes blend together into bands. The belly is light gray. The eyes are dark. The northern alligator lizard occurs along the Pacific Coast and in the Rocky Mountains from southern British Columbia through Washington, northern Idaho and western Montana south through Oregon to the coastal range and the Sierra Nevada in central California.

=== Rubber boa ===
The rubber boa (Charina bottae) is a snake in the family Boidae and genus Charina. The Boidae consists of the non-venomous snakes commonly called boas and consists of 43 species. The genus Charina consists of four species, three of which are found in North America, and one species found in Africa.

=== Common garter snake ===
The Puget Sound garter snake, (Thamnophis sirtalis pickeringii) is a subspecies of the common garter snake. It is a snake indigenous to the Puget Sound. Most garter snakes have a pattern of yellow stripes on a brown background and their average length is about 1 metre (3.3 ft) to 1.5 metres (4.9 ft). The common garter snake is a diurnal snake. In summer, it is most active in the morning and late afternoon; in cooler seasons or climates, it restricts its activity to the warm afternoons.

=== Northwestern garter snake ===
The northwestern garter snake, (Thamnophis ordinoides) is a species of colubrid garter snake that lives in Oregon, Washington, California, and British Columbia. The garter snake is small, with adults averaging around 14-21 inches long. The northwestern garter snake is one of the most variable snakes in the world, however, no subspecies have been confirmed. The snake is most commonly found on the edge of meadows, surrounded by forest, as some sunshine is needed for their survival.

== See also ==
- Mammals of Olympic National Park
