= List of reptiles of Latvia =

This is a list of the reptile species recorded in Latvia. The Latvian reptile fauna totals 7 species.

The following categories are used to highlight specific species' conservation status as assessed by the Red Data book of Latvia:

0 category	Extinct	Depleted species – species that are not found in the last 50 years.
1st category	Nearly extinct	Depleted species – species that are threatened with extinction and are rare.
2nd category	Critically Endangered	Diminishing species – species which individual number rapidly decreases.
3rd category	Endangered	Rare species – species that are of rare occurrence in small numbers.
4th category	Vulnerable	Little known or insufficiently explored species.

== Lizards ==
Sauria:

- Sand Lizard (Lacerta agilis) – 4th category
- Viviparous lizard (Zootoca vivipara)
- Slowworm (Anguis fragilis)

== Snakes ==
Serpentes:

- Smooth snake (Coronella austriaca) – 1st category
- Grass snake (Natrix natrix)
- Adder (Vipera berus)

== Turtles ==
Testudines:

- European pond turtle (Emys orbicularis) – 1st category
