= List of reptiles of Kaziranga National Park =

About 42 species of reptiles have been reported from the Kaziranga National Park, Assam, India. These include the endangered gharial and the rare Assam roofed turtle.

Two of the largest snakes in the world - the reticulated python and the rock python, as well as the longest venomous snake in the world - the king cobra are common inside the park. The park also contains Bengal monitor and water monitor populations. The park is home to the rare monocled cobra, and three of the Big Four - Indian cobra, Russell's viper, and common krait.

In all, Kaziranga is home to 15 species of turtles, including the endemic Assam roofed turtle, and to one species of tortoise - the brown tortoise. A regional lizard species is also found in Kaziranga - the Assam garden lizard.

== Crocodiles ==
- Gharial (Gavialis gangeticus)

The gharial (Gavialis gangeticus) (Hindi: घऱियाल, Marathi: सुसर Susar) also called Indian gavial or gavial, is the only surviving member of the once well-represented family Gavialidae, a long-established group of crocodilians with long, slender snouts. The gharial is listed as a critically endangered species by the IUCN. The gharial is one of the three crocodilians in India, the others being the mugger crocodile and the saltwater crocodile. It is one of the longest of all living crocodilians.

== Turtles and tortoises ==
- Assam roofed turtle (Kachuga sylhetensis)
- Indian roofed turtle (Kachuga tecta)
- Indian tent turtle (Kachuga tentoria)
- Tricarinate hill turtle (Melanochelys tricarinata)
- Indian eyed turtle (Morenia petersi)
- Gangetic or Indian softshell turtle (Aspideretes gangeticus)
- Indian peacock softshell turtle (Aspideretes hurum)
- Indian narrow-headed softshell turtle (Chitra indica)
- Indian flapshell turtle (Lissemys punctata)
- Oldham's leaf turtle (Cyclemys oldhami)
- Indian black turtle (Melanochelys trijuga)
- Keeled box turtle (Pyxidea mouhotii)
- Asian forest tortoise (Manouria emys)
- Amboina box turtle (Cuora amboinensis)
- Black pond turtle (Geoclemys hamiltonii)
- Brown roofed turtle (Kachuga smithii)

== Lizards ==
- Keeled Indian mabuya (Eutropis carinata)
- East Indian brown mabuya (Eutropis multifasciata)
- Tokay gecko (Gecko gecko)
- Common house gecko (Hemidactylus frenatus)
- Bengal monitor (Varanus bengalensis)
- Asian water monitor (Varanus salvator)
- Indo-Pacific gecko (Hemidactylus garnotii)
- Forest garden lizard (Calotes emma)
- Assam garden lizard (Calotes maria)
- Dotted garden skink (Lygosoma punctata)

== Snakes ==
- Greater black krait (Bungarus niger)
- Monocled cobra (Naja kaouthia)
- Banded kukri snake (Oligodon arnensis)
- Buff striped keelback (Amphiesma stolata)
- Long-nosed whip snake (Ahaetulla nasuta)
- Indian rock python (Python molurus)
- Reticulated python (Python reticulatus)
- Radiated ratsnake (Elaphe radiata)
- Indian rat snake (Ptyas mucosa)
- Common krait (Bungarus caeruleus)
- Banded krait (Bungarus fasciatus)
- King cobra (Ophiophagus hannah)
- Russell's viper (Daboia russelii)
- Pit vipers (Trimeresurus spp.)
