= List of reptiles and amphibians of the Aegean =

This list includes all reptiles found in Aegean Islands. It does not include species found only in captivity or those which are extinct. Each species is listed, with its binomial name and notes on its distribution where this is limited.

Summary of 2006 IUCN Red List categories.

Conservation status - IUCN Red List of Threatened Species:

EX - Extinct, EW - Extinct in the wild
CR - Critically endangered, EN - Endangered, VU - Vulnerable
NT - Near threatened, LC - Least concern
DD - Data deficient, NE - Not evaluated
(v. 2013.2, the data is current as of March 5, 2014)

== Turtles ==
Family: Testudinidae (tortoises)

- Spur-thighed tortoise, Testudo graeca VU (southern Europe)
- Marginated tortoise, Testudo marginata LC (southern Europe)

Family: Cheloniidae

- Loggerhead sea turtle, Caretta caretta EN (southern Europe)

== Lizards and snakes ==
=== Lizards ===
Family: Agamidae (agamas)

- Stellion, Agama stellio (Greek islands)

Family: Gekkonidae (geckos)

- Kotschy's gecko, Cyrtodactylus kotschyi LC (southern Europe)
- Mediterranean house gecko, Hemidactylus turcicus LC (southern Europe)

Family: Lacertidae (wall or true lizards)

Subfamily: Lacertinae

Tribe: Eremiadini
- Snake-eyed lizard, Ophisops elegans (Mediterranean and Central Asia)
Tribe: Lacertini
- Balkan green lizard, Lacerta trilineata LC (south-eastern Europe)
- Common wall lizard, Podarcis muralis LC
- Erhard's wall lizard, Podarcis erhardii LC (south-eastern Europe)

Family: Scincidae (Skinks)

- Ocellated skink, Chalcides ocellatus (Greece, Sicily and Sardinia)

Family: Anguidae

- European glass lizard, Ophisaurus apodus (south-eastern Europe)

=== Snakes ===
Family: Typhlopidae (blind snakes)

- European worm snake, Xerotyphlops vermicularis (south-eastern Europe)

Family: Boidae (boas)

- Sand boa, Eryx jaculus (south-eastern Europe)

Family: Colubridae (Colubrids)

Subfamily: Colubrinae

- Caspian whipsnake, Dolichophis caspius (south-eastern Europe, Turkey)
- Dahl's whip snake, Platyceps najadum LC (south-eastern Europe)
- Collared dwarf racer, Eirenis collaris LC (Bulgaria, Turkey, Georgia)
- Leopard snake, Zamenis situla LC (southern Europe)
- Aesculapian snake, Zamenis longissimus LC

Subfamily: Psammophiinae

- Montpellier snake, Malpolon monspessulanus LC (southern Europe)

Subfamily: Natricinae

- Grass snake, Natrix natrix LR/lc

Family: Viperidae

- Ottoman viper, Montivipera xanthina LC (Greece)

== See also ==
- List of reptiles of Turkey
- List of reptiles of Italy
- List of reptiles of Europe
