= List of reptiles of Michigan =

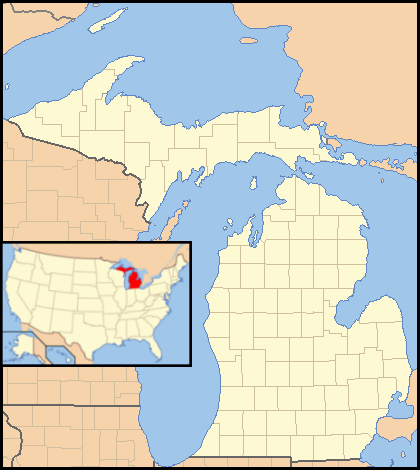
The state of Michigan, and its location in the United States

The US state of Michigan is home to two types of lizards, nineteen types of snakes and eleven types of turtles, all members of the class Reptilia. Reptiles are found throughout Michigan, although the only venomous species, the eastern massasauga rattlesnake, is seen only in the Lower Peninsula. Reptiles are cold-blooded, and so usually pass the cold winters of Michigan in frost-free areas, such as burrows (for snakes and land-dwelling turtles) or the bottoms of lakes and streams (for water-dwelling turtles). Most reptiles in Michigan are protected by state law, but many are still at risk due to human encroachment on their habitats, the draining of wetlands and, in the case of snakes, indiscriminate killing by fearful humans. In 1995, the painted turtle was named as Michigan's state reptile.

Reptile habitats in Michigan are generally split into four regions: the northern and southern Lower Peninsula and the eastern and western Upper Peninsula, with differentiations based on climate, soils, underlying bedrock and glacially-derived landforms. Region one, the southern Lower Peninsula, is generally characterized by a warmer, less variable climate. Loam and clay soils dominate the region, with a lesser amount of sand. Deciduous hardwoods are the dominant tree species, with some natural prairies and savannas. There is a greater diversity of plant life in this region, and it includes plant and animal species that are not found in any of the other regions. Region two, the northern Lower Peninsula, has a climate that is cooler and more variable, with greater precipitation due to its proximity to the Great Lakes, more extensive uplands and more northern latitude. Sandy soils and glacial deposits are the dominant soil type, while forests of conifer or mixed conifer and hardwood predominate. Swamps and bogs are found more often in region two than region one. Region three, the eastern Upper Peninsula, has a climate profile similar to region two. Sand and clay dominate the soil of this region, which tends to be low in nutrients and poorly drained. There are extensive wetlands, dominated by coniferous forests, while upland areas provide mixed conifer and broadleaf hardwood tracts. Region four, the western Upper Peninsula, provides extensive bedrock structures. The temperature is less moderate than in the other three regions, and can see frigid winters and hot summers. Mixed conifer and broadleaf forests again dominate.

Three species of reptiles are considered to be threatened and two species are endangered – these are protected under the Endangered Species Act of the State of Michigan. Six more species are considered to be of special concern, though not protected under the act. The copperbelly water snake is listed as threatened by the federal government, while the eastern massasauga rattlesnake is a candidate species to be included on the US endangered species list.

== Lizards ==
Scientific name	Common name	Description	Image	Notes
Cnemidophorus sexlineatus	Six-lined racerunner	Adults are 6 to 10.5 inches (15 to 27 cm) in length and colored olive, gray, brown or black with six lighter-colored stripes.		Found only in Tuscola County in eastern Michigan, considered a threatened species
Plestiodon fasciatus	Five-lined skink	Adults are up to 8.5 inches (22 cm) in length and colored gray-brown or dark brown with five white or cream stripes.		

== Snakes ==
Scientific name	Common name	Description	Image	Notes
Clonophis kirtlandii	Kirtland's snake	Adults are 12 to 18 inches (30 to 46 cm) in length and colored reddish-brown with black blotches and head. Non-venomous.		Considered an endangered species in Michigan
Coluber constrictor foxii	Blue racer	Adults are 4 to 6 feet (1.2 to 1.8 m) in length and colored gray or blue. Non-venomous.		
Diadophis punctatus edwardsii	Northern ring-necked snake	Adults are 10 to 24 inches (25 to 61 cm) in length and colored black or gray with yellow belly and neck ring. Non-venomous.		
Pantherophis gloydi	Eastern fox snake	Adults are 3 to 5 feet (0.91 to 1.52 m) in length and colored yellow or light brown with dark splotches. Non-venomous.		Considered a threatened species in Michigan
Pantherophis vulpina	Eastern fox snake	Adults are 3 to 5 feet (0.91 to 1.52 m) in length and colored yellow or light brown with dark splotches. Non-venomous.		
Heterodon platirhinos	Eastern hog-nosed snake	Adults are 20 to 40 inches (51 to 102 cm) in length and have variable coloring and patterning that ranges from yellow to black. Non-venomous.		
Lampropeltis triangulum triangulum	Eastern milk snake	Adults are 2 to 4 feet (0.61 to 1.22 m) in length and colored gray or tan with red or brown blotches. Non-venomous.		
Liochlorophis vernalis	Smooth green snake	Adults are 12 to 20 inches (30 to 51 cm) in length and bright green in color. Non-venomous.		
Nerodia erythrogaster neglecta	Copperbelly water snake	Adults are 4 to 5 feet (1.2 to 1.5 m) in length and colored dark brown or black with a red or orange underside. Non-venomous.		Considered a threatened species by the US government, and an endangered species in Michigan
Nerodia sipedon	Northern water snake	Adults are 2 to 4 feet (0.61 to 1.22 m) in length and colored light brown or gray with dark bands or splotches. Non-venomous.		
Pantherophis alleghaniensis	Central ratsnake	Adults are generally 3 to 5 feet (0.91 to 1.52 m) in length and colored gray with darker blotches. Non-venomous.		Considered a species of special concern in Michigan
Regina septemvittata	Queen snake	Adults are 15 to 36 inches (38 to 91 cm) in length and colored gray or brown with a light stripe on either side of the body. Non-venomous.		Considered a species of special concern in Michigan
Sistrurus catenatus catenatus	Eastern massasauga rattlesnake	Adults are 2 to 3 feet (0.61 to 0.91 m) in length and colored gray or brown with dark brown patches. Venomous.		A candidate species for listing on the federal endangered species list, and a species of special concern in Michigan
Storeria dekayi	Brown snake	Adults are 9 to 15 inches (23 to 38 cm) in length and colored brown or gray with a light stripe down the back which is bordered by dark spots. Non-venomous.		
Storeria occipitomaculata occipitomaculata	Red-bellied snake	Adults are 8 to 16 inches (20 to 41 cm) in length and colored brown or gray with a reddish underside. Non-venomous.		
Thamnophis butleri	Butler's garter snake	Adults are 15 to 27 inches (38 to 69 cm) in length and colored black, brown or olive with three yellow length-wise stripes. Non-venomous.		
Thamnophis saurita septentrionalis	Northern ribbon snake	Adults are 18 to 38 inches (46 to 97 cm) in length and colored black or brown with three yellow length-wise stripes. Non-venomous.		
Thamnophis sirtalis	Eastern garter snake	Adults are 2 to 4 feet (0.61 to 1.22 m) in length and colored gray, brown or green with three yellow length-wise stripes. Non-venomous.		

== Turtles ==
Scientific name	Common name	Description	Image	Notes
Apalone spinifera spinifera	Spiny soft-shell turtle	Adults are 5 to 19 inches (13 to 48 cm) in length and colored olive or brown with dark spots.		
Chelydra serpentina	Common snapping turtle	Adults are 8 to 19.3 inches (20 to 49 cm) in length and colored gray, brown or olive.		
Chrysemys picta bellii	Western painted turtle	Adults are 4 to 9.8 inches (10 to 25 cm) in length and colored black or olive with red and yellow markings and underside. Differentiated from C. p. marginata by narrow dark blotch on underside.		
Chrysemys picta marginata	Midland painted turtle	Adults are 4 to 9.8 inches (10 to 25 cm) in length and colored black or olive with red and yellow markings and underside. Differentiated from C. p. bellii by wide dark blotch on underside.		
Clemmys guttata	Spotted turtle	Adults are 3.5 to 5 inches (8.9 to 12.7 cm) in length and colored black with yellow spots.		Considered a threatened species in Michigan
Emys blandingii	Blanding's turtle	Adults are 6 to 10.75 inches (15.2 to 27.3 cm) in length and colored black with yellow speckles.		Considered a species of special concern in Michigan
Glyptemys insculpta	Wood turtle	Adults are 6.3 to 9.4 inches (16 to 24 cm) in length and colored brown, with an ornate, sculpted appearance to the shell.		Considered a species of special concern in Michigan
Graptemys geographica	Common map turtle	Adults are 4 to 10.7 inches (10 to 27 cm) in length and colored green, olive or brown with yellow markings and underside.		
Sternotherus odoratus	Common musk turtle	Adults are 3.25 to 5.37 inches (8.3 to 13.6 cm) in length and colored black or brown; often have algae covering the shell.		
Terrapene carolina carolina	Eastern box turtle	Adults are 4.5 to 7.8 inches (11 to 20 cm) in length and dark colored with yellow or orange patterns.		Considered a species of special concern in Michigan
Trachemys scripta elegans	Red-eared slider	Adults are 5 to 11 inches (13 to 28 cm) in length and colored green or brown with yellow and black markings; distinct red stripe behind each eye.		Not indigenous to Michigan; possibly introduced through importation as pets

== See also ==
- List of fauna of Michigan
