= List of reptiles of Massachusetts =

This is a list of reptiles of Massachusetts. It includes all reptiles currently found in the US state of Massachusetts in alphabetical order of scientific name. It does not include species found only in captivity.

== Snakes ==
| Name | Scientific name | Order | Family | Range and status | IUCN Red List |
|---|---|---|---|---|---|
| Northern copperhead | Agkistrodon contortrix mokasen | Snake | Viperidae | Rare, endangered in the state; found in Norfolk, Berkshire, and Hampden Counties | |
| Black racer | Coluber constrictor | Snake | Colubridae | Locally common although declining; statewide except Nantucket | |
| Timber rattlesnake | Crotalus horridus | Snake | Viperidae | Very rare, endangered in the state; found in Berkshire, Hampden, Hampshire, and Norfolk counties | |
| Eastern worm snake | Carphophis ameonus amoenus | Snake | Colubridae | Rare and threatened in the Commonwealth; found only in the Southern Connecticut River Valley in Hampden and Hampshire Counties | |
| Ring-necked snake | Diadophis punctatus | Snake | Colubridae | Common and widespread in the Commonwealth; statewide | |
| Eastern hog-nosed snake | Heterodon platirhinos | Snake | Colubridae | Uncommon; spotty distribution, but found in all counties except Berkshire, Nantucket, and Dukes County | |
| Eastern milk snake | Lampropeltis triangulum | Snake | Colubridae | Common; statewide | |
| Northern water snake | Nerodia sipedon | Snake | Colubridae | Common; statewide except Dukes County | |
| Smooth green snake | Opheodrys vernalis | Snake | Colubridae | Common but declining due to habitat loss; statewide | |
| Black rat snake | Pantherophis obsoletus | Snake | Colubridae | Very rare, endangered in the Commonwealth; found only in Southern Worcester County, the Connecticut River Valley and Essex County | |
| DeKay's brown snake | Storeria dekayi | Snake | Colubridae | Common; statewide except Martha's Vineyard island and Nantucket | |
| Brahminy blind snake | Ramphotyphlops braminus | Snake | Typhlopidae | Introduced; reported to occur only in and around Boston; status unclear | |
| Northern redbelly snake | Storeria occipitomaculata occipitomaculata | Snake | Colubridae | Common; statewide except Nantucket | |
| Ribbon snake | Thamnophis sauritus | Snake | Colubridae | Common but declining; statewide | |
| Common garter snake | Thamnophis sirtalis | Snake | Colubridae | Common; statewide | |

== Turtles ==
| Name | Scientific name | Order | Family | Range and status | IUCN Red List |
|---|---|---|---|---|---|
| Loggerhead sea turtle | Caretta caretta | Turtle | Cheloniidae | Very rare, located in coastal waters of the southeast; one recorded in Essex County in 2008; endangered federally and in the Commonwealth | |
| Green sea turtle | Chelonia mydas | Turtle | Cheloniidae | Very rare, reported from Dukes, Nantucket, and Cape Cod; listed as threatened in the Commonwealth and endangered federally | |
| Common snapping turtle | Chelydra serpentina | Turtle | Chelydridae | Common; statewide | |
| Painted turtle | Chrysemys picta | Turtle | Emydidae | Common; statewide | |
| Spotted turtle | Clemmys guttata | Turtle | Emydidae | Locally common to uncommon; statewide except Northern Berkshire County and Suffolk County | |
| Leatherback sea turtle | Dermochelys coriacea | Turtle | Dermochelyidae | Very rare, coastal southeastern waters; endangered | |
| Blanding's turtle | Emydoidea blandingii | Turtle | Emydidae | Rare, scattered populations in east; threatened in the Commonwealth | |
| Hawksbill sea turtle | Eretmochelys imbricata | Turtle | Cheloniidae | Rare vagrant, recorded in 1909, 1968, and 1989; critically endangered | |
| Wood turtle | Glyptemys insculpta | Turtle | Emydidae | Uncommon, found statewide anywhere north and west of Bristol County and Plymouth County; listed as special concern | |
| Bog turtle | Glyptemys muhlenbergii | Turtle | Emydidae | Very rare, found only in Berkshire County; critically endangered in the commonwealth and federally | |
| Kemp's ridley sea turtle | Lepidochelys kempii | Turtle | Cheloniidae | Recorded from Cape Cod, Dukes County, and Nantucket; listed as endangered in the Commonwealth, critically endangered globally | |
| Diamondback terrapin | Malaclemys terrapin | Turtle | Emydidae | Uncommon, found in Cape Cod, Plymouth County, and Bristol County; listed as threatened federally and in the Commonwealth | |
| Northern red-bellied cooter | Pseudemys rubriventris | Turtle | Emydidae | Rare, found only in Plymouth County; listed as endangered | |
| Eastern musk turtle | Sternotherus odoratus | Turtle | Kinosternidae | Common; statewide except Dukes and Nantucket Counties | |
| Eastern box turtle | Terrapene carolina carolina | Turtle | Emydidae | Uncommon, statewide except possibly Nantucket; listed as special concern | |
| Red-eared slider | Trachemys scripta elegans | Turtle | Emydidae | Introduced; may occur statewide, most likely common | |

== Lizards ==
| Name | Scientific name | Order | Family | Range and status | IUCN Red List |
|---|---|---|---|---|---|
| Common five-lined skink | Plestidon fasciatus | Lizard | Scincidae | Extirpated; formerly Western and Southern Massachusetts (Berkshire and Bristol Counties), but now absent from the Commonwealth due to habitat loss | |
| Italian wall lizard | Podarcis siculus | Lizard | Lacertidae | Introduced; recorded only in Suffolk County, unconfirmed reports in Middlesex County. | |
