= List of snakes of New Jersey =

This is a list of snakes found in New Jersey, United States. There are 23 species of snakes, although the Queen snake (Regina septemvittata) is likely extirpated. The New Jersey official snake guide also lists a rare snake hybrid between the L. t. triangulum and the L. t. elapsoides living in the southern portion of the state.

== Non-venomous ==
#	Image	Binomial name	Name
1		Carphophis amoenus amoenus	Eastern worm snake
2		Cemophora coccinea copei	Northern scarlet snake
3		Coluber constrictor constrictor	Northern black racer
4		Diadophus punctatus edwardsii	Northern ringneck snake
5	framless	Diadophus punctatus punctatus	Southern ringneck snake
6		Heterodon platirhinos	Eastern hognose snake
7		Lampropeltis getula getula	Eastern kingsnake
8		Lampropeltis triangulum	Eastern milk snake
9		Nerodia sipedon sipedon	Northern water snake
10		Opheodrys aestivus	Rough green snake
11		Opheodrys vernalis	Smooth green snake
12		Pantherophis alleghaniensis	Central rat snake
13		Pantherophis guttatus	Corn snake
14		Pituophis melanoleucus melanoleucus	Northern pine snake
15		Regina septemvittata	Queen snake
16		Storeria dekayi dekayi	Northern brown snake
17		Storeria occipitomaculata occipitomaculata	Northern red-bellied snake
18		Thamnophis sauritus sauritus	Eastern ribbon snake
19		Thamnophis sirtalis sirtalis	Eastern garter snake
20		Virginia valeriae valeriae	Eastern smooth earth snake

== Venomous ==
#	Image	Binomial name	Name
21		Agkistrodon contortrix mokasen	Northern copperhead
22		Crotalus horridus	Timber rattlesnake
