= List of reptiles of Virginia =

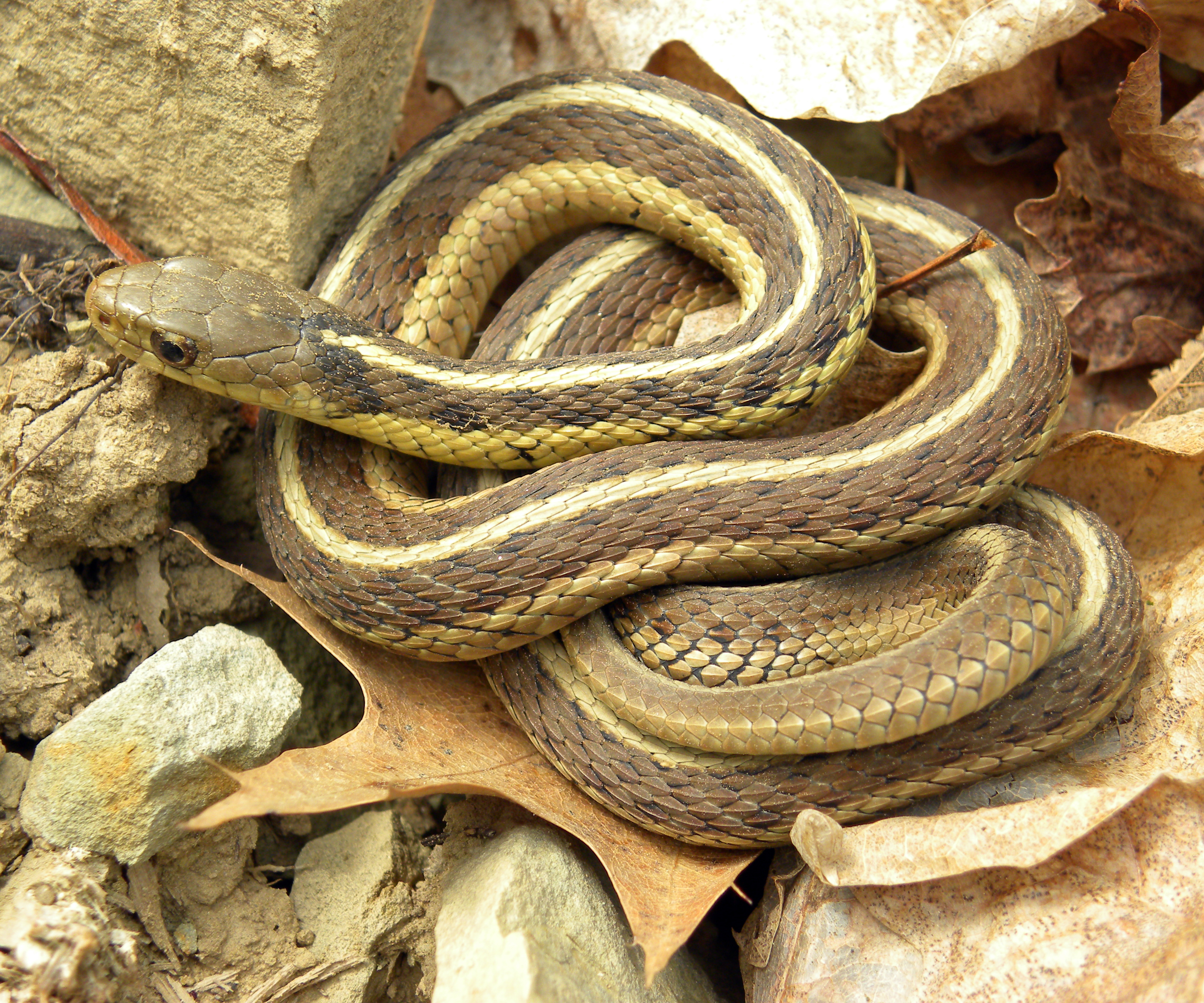
The eastern garter snake (Thamnophis sirtalis sirtalis), the state snake of Virginia

This is a list of reptiles found in the state of Virginia, including both native and introduced species with an established population.

== Testudines (turtles) ==
Name	Species / subspecies	Family	Conservation status				Photo
Name	Species / subspecies	Family	IUCN Red List	Federal (ESA)	State (Virginia DWR)	State (NatureServe)	Photo
Loggerhead sea turtle	Caretta caretta	Cheloniidae		Threatened	State threatened	Critically imperiled (S1)	
Green sea turtle	Chelonia mydas	Cheloniidae		Threatened	State threatened		
Hawksbill sea turtle	Eretmochelys imbricata	Cheloniidae		Endangered	State endangered		
Kemp's ridley sea turtle	Lepidochelys kempii	Cheloniidae		Endangered	State endangered	Critically imperiled (S1)	
Common snapping turtle	Chelydra serpentina	Chelydridae				Secure (S5)	
Leatherback sea turtle	Dermochelys coriacea	Dermochelyidae		Endangered	State endangered		
Painted turtle	Chrysemys picta	Emydidae				Secure (S5)	
Spotted turtle	Clemmys guttata	Emydidae				Apparently secure (S4)	
Eastern chicken turtle	Deirochelys reticularia reticularia	Emydidae			State endangered	Critically imperiled (S1)	
Wood turtle	Glyptemys insculpta	Emydidae			State threatened	Imperiled (S2)	
Bog turtle	Glyptemys muhlenbergii	Emydidae		Endangered (S/A)	State endangered	Imperiled (S2)	
Northern map turtle	Graptemys geographica	Emydidae				Vulnerable (S3)	
Northern diamondback terrapin	Malaclemys terrapin terrapin	Emydidae				Vulnerable (S3)	
River cooter	Pseudemys concinna	Emydidae				Apparently secure (S4)	
Coastal plain cooter	Pseudemys floridana	Emydidae				Vulnerable (S3)	
Northern red-bellied cooter	Pseudemys rubriventris	Emydidae				Apparently secure (S4)	
Eastern box turtle	Terrapene carolina carolina	Emydidae				Apparently secure (S4)	
Pond slider	Trachemys scripta	Emydidae				Apparently secure (S4)	
Striped mud turtle	Kinosternon baurii	Kinosternidae				Apparently secure (S4)	
Eastern mud turtle	Kinosternon subrubrum subrubrum	Kinosternidae				Secure (S5)	
Stripe-necked musk turtle	Sternotherus minor peltifer	Kinosternidae				Imperiled (S2)	
Eastern musk turtle	Sternotherus odoratus	Kinosternidae				Secure (S5)	
Northern spiny softshell turtle	Apalone spinifera spinifera	Trionychidae				Imperiled (S2)	

== Lizards ==
Name	Species / subspecies	Family	Conservation status			Photo
Name	Species / subspecies	Family	IUCN Red List	State (Virginia DWR)	State (NatureServe)	Photo
Eastern slender glass lizard	Ophisaurus attenuatus longicaudus	Anguidae			Apparently secure (S4)	
Eastern glass lizard	Ophisaurus ventralis	Anguidae		State threatened	Critically imperiled (S1)	
Eastern fence lizard	Sceloporus undulatus	Phrynosomatidae			Secure (S5)	
Northern coal skink	Plestiodon anthracinus anthracinus	Scincidae			Vulnerable (S3)	
Common five-lined skink	Plestiodon fasciatus	Scincidae			Secure (S5)	
Southeastern five-lined skink	Plestiodon inexpectatus	Scincidae			Secure (S5)	
Broad-headed skink	Plestiodon laticeps	Scincidae			Secure (S5)	
Little brown skink	Scincella lateralis	Scincidae			Secure (S5)	
Eastern six-lined racerunner	Aspidocelis sexlineatus sexlineatus	Teiidae			Secure (S5)	

== Snakes ==
Name	Species / subspecies	Family	Conservation status		Photo
Name	Species / subspecies	Family	IUCN Red List	State (NatureServe)	Photo
Eastern worm snake	Carphophis amoenus amoenus	Colubridae		Secure (S5)	
Northern scarlet snake	Cemophora coccinea copei	Colubridae		Apparently secure (S4)	
Northern black racer	Coluber constrictor constrictor	Colubridae		Secure (S5)	
Ring-necked snake	Diadophis punctatus	Colubridae		Secure (S5)	
Eastern mud snake	Farancia abacura abacura	Colubridae		Apparently secure (S4)	
Common rainbow snake	Farancia erytrogramma erytrogramma	Colubridae		Vulnerable (S3)	
Rough earth snake	Haldea striatula	Colubridae		Apparently secure (S4)	
Eastern hognose snake	Heterodon platirhinos	Colubridae		Secure (S5)	
Scarlet kingsnake	Lampropeltis elapsoides	Colubridae			
Eastern kingsnake	Lampropeltis getula getula	Colubridae		Secure (S5)	
Eastern black kingsnake	Lampropeltis nigra	Colubridae		Imperiled (S2)	
Northern mole kingsnake	Lampropeltis rhombomaculata	Colubridae		Secure (S5)	
Eastern milk snake	Lampropeltis triangulum triangulum	Colubridae		Secure (S5)	
Crayfish snake	Liodytes rigida	Colubridae		Critically imperiled (S1)	
Plain-bellied water snake	Nerodia erythrogaster	Colubridae		Apparently secure (S4)	
Northern water snake	Nerodia sipedon sipedon	Colubridae		Secure (S5)	
Brown water snake	Nerodia taxispilota	Colubridae		Apparently secure (S4)	
Northern rough green snake	Opheodrys aestivus aestivus	Colubridae		Secure (S5)	
Smooth green snake	Opheodrys vernalis	Colubridae		Vulnerable (S3)	
Yellow ratsnake	Pantherophis quadrivittatus	Colubridae		Secure (S5)	
Central ratsnake	Pantherophis alleghaniensis	Colubridae			
Corn snake	Pantherophis guttatus	Colubridae		Apparently secure (S4)	
Northern pine snake	Pituophis melanoleucus melanoleucus	Colubridae		Possibly extirpated	
Queen snake	Regina septemvittata	Colubridae		Secure (S5)	
DeKay's brown snake	Storeria dekayi	Colubridae		Secure (S5)	
Red-bellied snake	Storeria occipitomaculata	Colubridae		Secure (S5)	
Southeastern crown snake	Tantilla coronata	Colubridae		Vulnerable (S3)	
Eastern ribbonsnake	Thamnophis saurita saurita	Colubridae		Secure (S5)	
Eastern garter snake	Thamnophis sirtalis sirtalis	Colubridae		Secure (S5)	
Smooth earth snake	Virginia valeriae	Colubridae		Secure (S5)	
Eastern copperhead	Agkistrodon contortix	Viperidae		Secure (S5)	
Northern cottonmouth	Agkistrodon piscivorus	Viperidae		Vulnerable (S3)	
Timber rattlesnake	Crotalus horridus	Viperidae		Apparently secure (S4)	

== Introduced reptiles ==
- Brahminy blindsnake (Indotyphlops braminus)
- Green anole (Anolis carolinensis) (naturalized?)
- Italian wall lizard (Podarcis siculus)
- Mediterranean house gecko (Hemidactylus turcicus)
- Mississippi map turtle (Graptemys pseudogeographica kohnii)
- Red-eared slider (Trachemys scripta elegans)
