= List of snakes of South Dakota =

Snakes of South Dakota
| Common name | Scientific name | Distribution (within South Dakota) | Description | Photograph |
|---|---|---|---|---|
| Brown snake | Storeria dekayi | eastern Roberts County (status in question; last formal reported sighting in 1922) | 8 - 15 inches in length, greyish-brown to reddish-brown colouration, with light stripe down the center of the back (bordered by parallel row of dark spots), and dark markings under and/or behind each eye | |
| Bullsnake | Pituophis catenifer | All portions of the state west of the Missouri River, all counties adjacent to the east bank of the Missouri River, and across southeastern and central South Dakota | 36 - 72 inches in length, yellowish colouration (with brown or black blotches that appear as rings near the tail) | |
| Common garter snake (sometimes called the "red-sided garter snake") | Thamnophis sirtalis | throughout the state | 15 - 28 inches in length, bright yellow or orange stripe along middle of the back, yellow or orange stripe along each side, with black spots on red colouration also along both sides | |
| Eastern hognose snake | Heterodon platirhinos | extreme southeastern fringe of the state | 20 - 33 inches in length, slightly upturned snout (as compared to the Plains hognose snake), highly variable in colouration (with dark blotches along center, and alternating spots on each side) | |
| Western fox snake | Pantherophis ramspotti | far southeastern South Dakota | 36 - 54 inches in length, yellowish to light brown in colouration (with bold blotches) | |
| Lined snake | Tropidoclonion lineatum | far southeastern South Dakota | 9 - 15 inches in length, grey or brown in colouration (with three pale stripes; one along the back, and one each along either side) | |
| Western milksnake | Lampropeltis gentilis | the western milksnake is found throughout that portion of the state west of the Missouri River, as well as in counties adjacent to the river's east bank | 16 - 28 inches in length, red and orange blotches bordered with black, and separated by yellow or white bands (head is orange with black flecks) | |
| Eastern milksnake | Lampropeltis triangulum syspila | the eastern milksnake subspecies is found in far southeastern South Dakota | 16 - 28 inches in length, red and orange blotches bordered with black, and separated by yellow or white bands (with red head & snout) | |
| Plains garter snake | Thamnophis radix | throughout the state | 20 - 28 inches in length, bright yellow or orange stripe along middle of the back, with yellow or orange stripe & alternating row of dark spots along each side, with dark head | |
| Plains hognose snake | Heterodon nasicus | throughout the state | 15 - 25 inches in length, sharply upturned snout (as compared to the eastern hognose snake), dark blotches along center and sides of body, blackish underside | |
| Prairie rattlesnake | Crotalus viridis | throughout that portion of the state west of the Missouri river, as well as in counties adjacent to the river's east bank | 30 - 45 inches in length, South Dakota's only venomous snake (bite is potentially fatal to humans), readily identifiable by rattle segment(s) at the end of the tail, light brown to greenish in colouration, triangular-shaped head with pits located below the midline of each eye & nostril | |
| Racer (sometimes called the "blue racer") | Coluber constrictor foxii | throughout that portion of the state west of the Missouri River, as well as in counties adjacent to the river's east bank | 30 - 50 inches in length, adults are blue to greenish in colouration (with a bright yellow belly), while juveniles have an ornate blotched, spotted, and speckled pattern | |
| Redbelly snake ("Black Hills" subspecies) | Storeria occipitomaculata pahasapae | the Black Hills redbelly snake subspecies is found within the Black Hills of South Dakota | 8 - 11 inches in length, slender body with grey, brown, or reddish-brown colouration, with a white chin, red belly, light spots on neck, and faint light stripe(s) along the back | |
| Redbelly snake ("northern" subspecies) | Storeria occipitomaculata occipitomaculata | the northern redbelly snake subspecies is found in extreme eastern South Dakota | 8 - 11 inches in length, slender body with grey, brown, or reddish-brown colouration, with a white chin, red belly, light spots on neck, and faint light stripe(s) along the back | |
| Ringneck snake | Diadophis punctatus | far southeastern South Dakota | 10 - 15 inches in length, dark (black or grey) upper body, a yellow or orange belly (with black spots), and a bright yellow or yellow-orange ring around the neck | |
| Smooth green snake | Liochlorophis vernalis | non-contiguous regions of far northeastern and far southeastern South Dakota, plus a third pocket in the Black Hills | 14 - 20 inches in length, small and slender, with uniformly green upper body, head, and tail (and a whitish belly) | |
| Wandering garter snake | Thamnophis elegans vagrans | the Black Hills | 18 - 30 inches in length, dull brown to greenish in colouration, yellow or orange mid-dorsal stripe on each side, a brown head (with yellow spots) and black bars on the lips | |
| Water snake (sometimes called the "northern water snake") | Nerodia sipedon | southern riverine and wetland areas of Bon Homme County (near Springfield) | 24 - 42 inches in length, dark brown to grey in colouration, dark upper bands on front part of body, alternating dark blotches or crossbands on the rear portion of the upper body (juveniles are lighter in color) | |
