= Mammals of Olympic National Park =

List of mammals at an American park

Orca

There are at least 9 large terrestrial mammals, 50 small mammals, and 14 marine mammal species known to occur in Olympic National Park.

Species are listed by common name, scientific name, and occurrence. Common and scientific names from Washington State Field Guides-Mammals of Washington.

== Legend ==
- A = Abundant
- C = Common
- CL = Common locally
- U= Uncommon
- UL = Uncommon locally
- R = Rare
- E = Extirpated
- I = Introduced
- EN = Endemic species

== Large mammals ==
=== Black bear ===
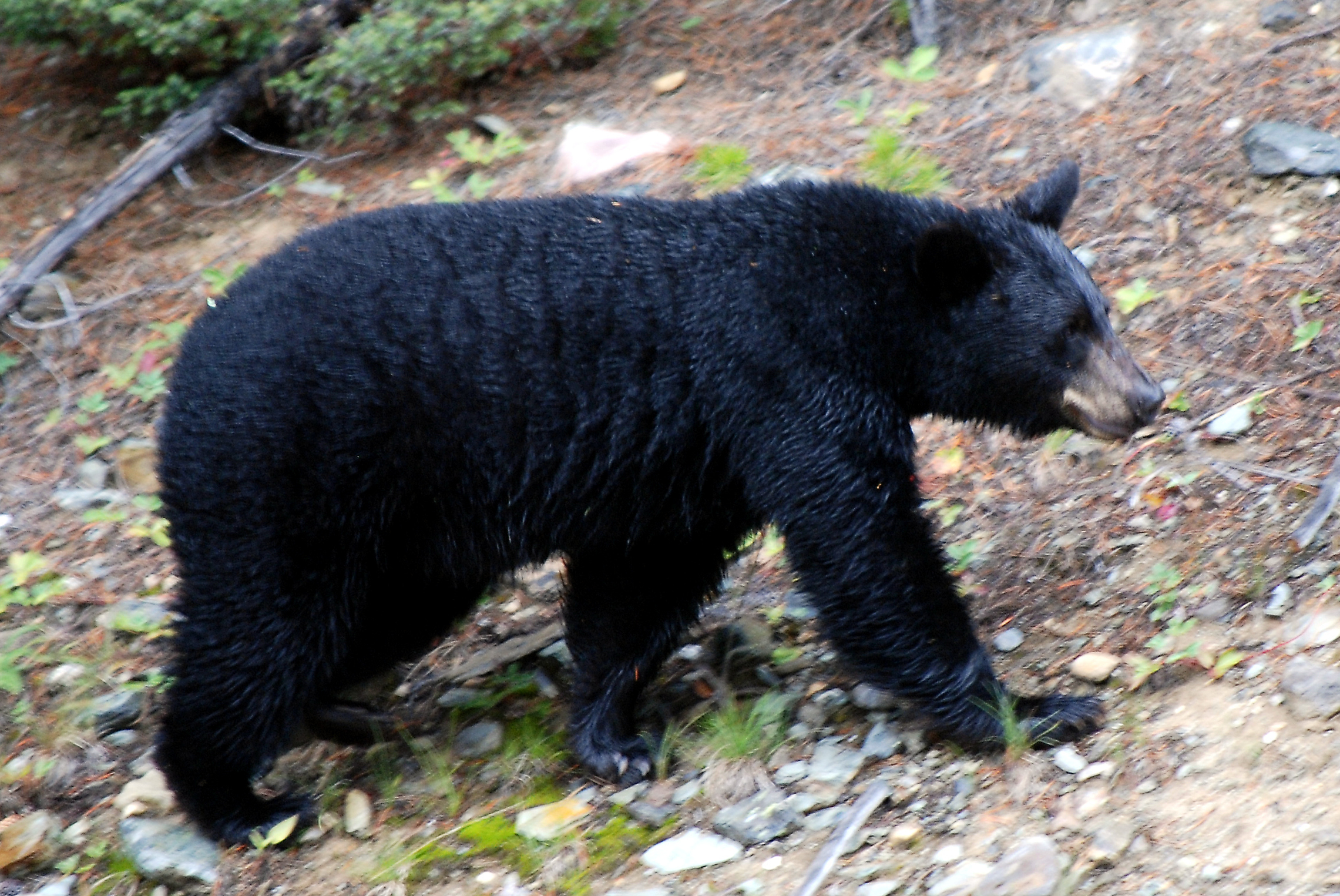
Black bear

Order: Carnivora, Family: Ursidae

Occurrence: Forests, slide areas, alpine meadows - C

The American black bear (Ursus americanus) is North America's smallest and most common species of bear. It is a generalist animal, being able to exploit numerous different habitats and foodstuffs. The American black bear is listed by the IUCN as least concern, due to the species widespread distribution and a large global population estimated to be twice that of all other bear species combined.

=== Bobcat ===
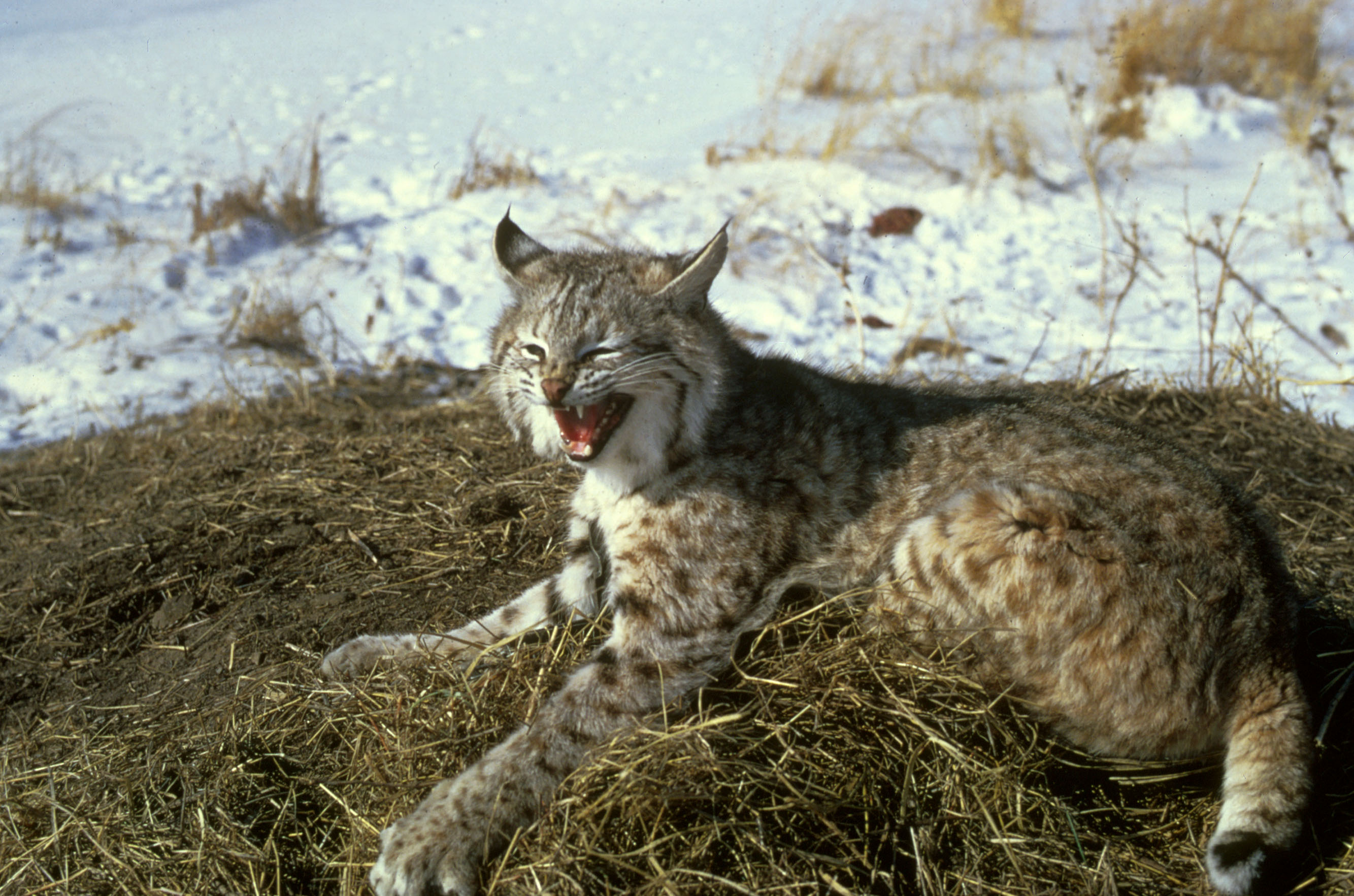
Bobcat

Order: Carnivora, Family: Felidae

Occurrence: Open forests, brushy areas - C

The bobcat (Lynx rufus) is a North American mammal of the cat family, Felidae. With twelve recognized subspecies, it ranges from southern Canada to northern Mexico, including most of the continental United States. The bobcat is an adaptable predator that inhabits wooded areas, as well as semi-desert, urban edge, forest edges and swampland environments. It persists in much of its original range and populations are healthy.

=== Cougar ===
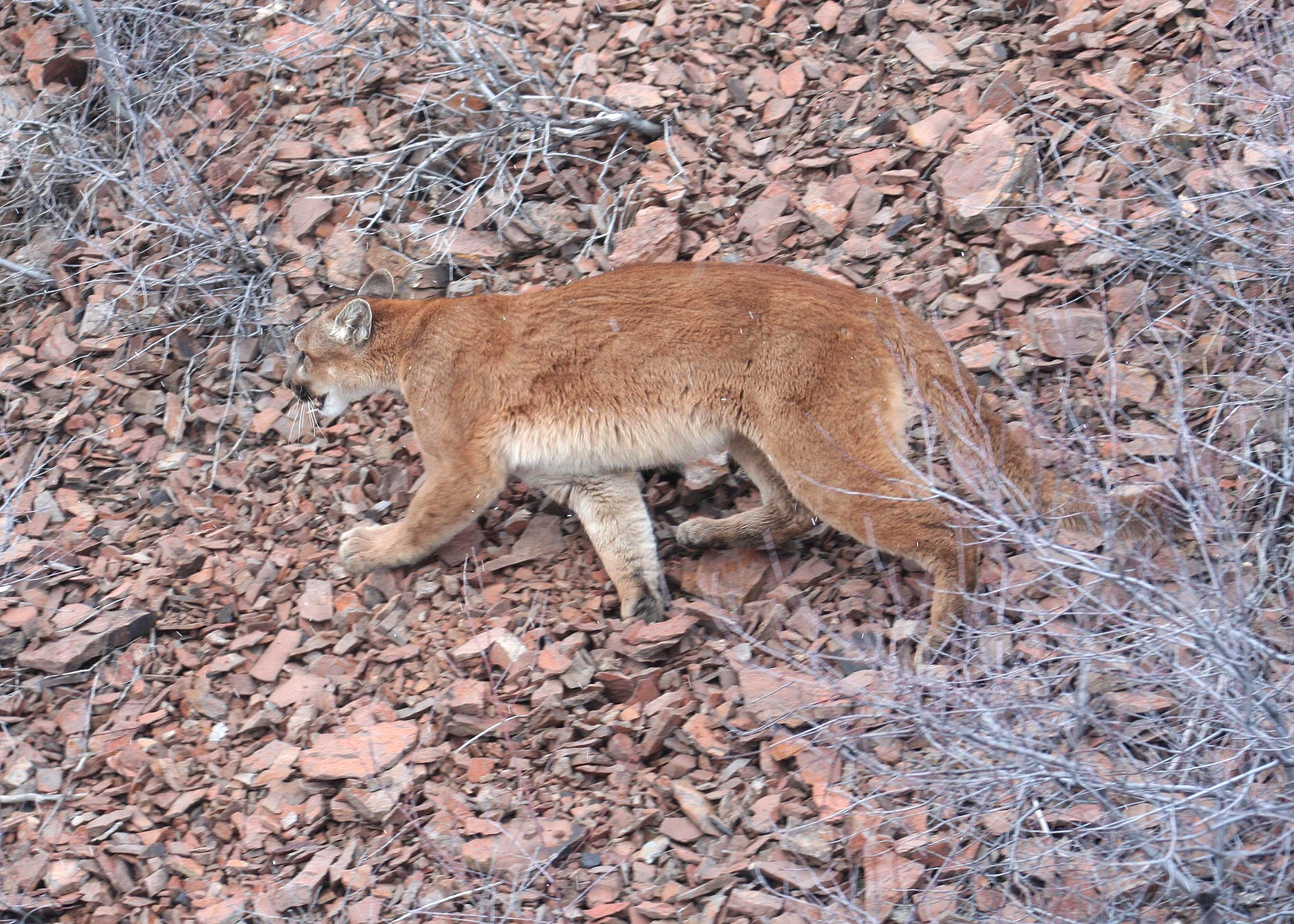
Cougar

Order: Carnivora, Family: Felidae

Occurrence: Coniferous forests - C

The cougar (Puma concolor), also known as puma, mountain lion, mountain cat, catamount or panther, depending on the region, is a mammal of the family Felidae, native to the Americas. This large, solitary cat has the greatest range of any large wild terrestrial mammal in the Western Hemisphere, extending from Yukon in Canada to the southern Andes of South America. An adaptable, generalist species, the cougar is found in every major American habitat type. It is the second heaviest cat in the American continents after the jaguar. Although large, the cougar is most closely related to smaller felines.

=== Coyote ===
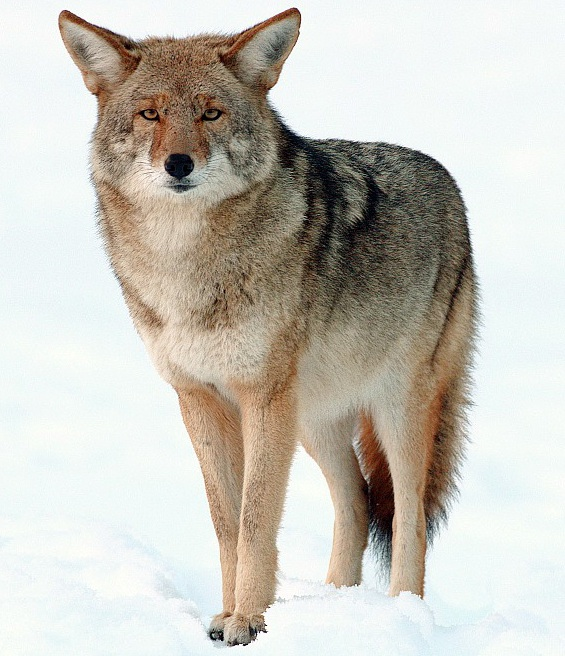
Coyote

Order: Carnivora, Family: Canidae

Occurrence: Forests, grasslands - C

The coyote (/kaɪˈoʊtiː/ or /ˈkaɪ.oʊt/) (Canis latrans), also known as the American jackal or the prairie wolf, is a species of canid found throughout North and Central America, ranging from Panama in the south, north through Mexico, the United States and Canada. It occurs as far north as Alaska and all but the Arctic portions of Canada.

=== Elk ===
The subspecies Roosevelt elk (Cervus canadensis roosevelti) occurs in the park.

Order: Artiodactyla, Family: Cervidae

Occurrence: Open forests, meadows - C

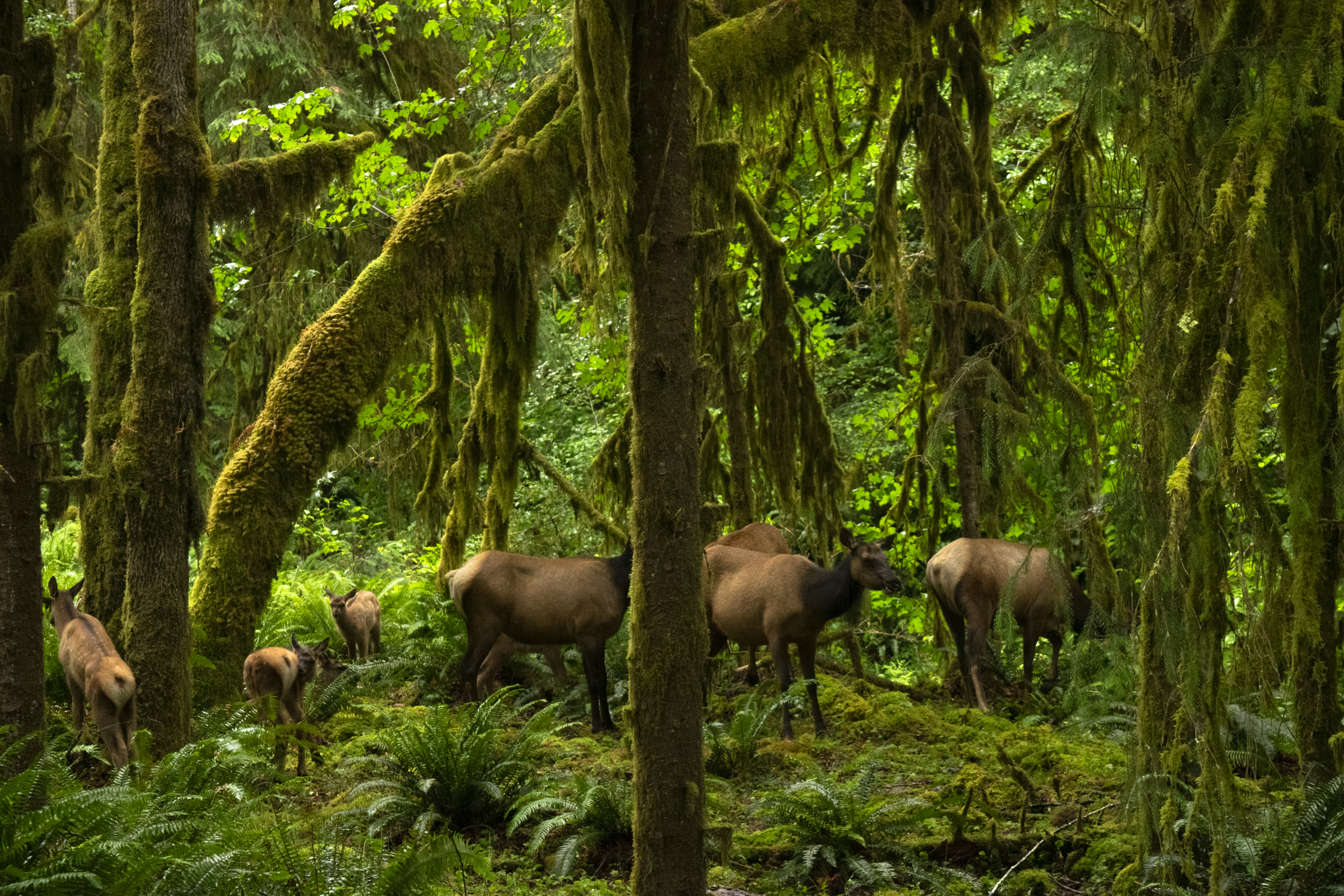
Elk

The elk, or wapiti (Cervus canadensis), is one of the largest species of deer in the world and one of the largest mammals in North America and eastern Asia. In the deer family (Cervidae), only the moose, Alces alces (called an "elk" in Europe), is larger, and Cervus unicolor (the sambar deer) can rival the C. canadensis elk in size. Elk range in forest and forest-edge habitat, feeding on grasses, plants, leaves, and bark.

=== Mountain goat ===
The mountain goat is an introduced species within the park. The park and Forest Service are undertaking projects to relocate mountain goats to the Cascade mountains.

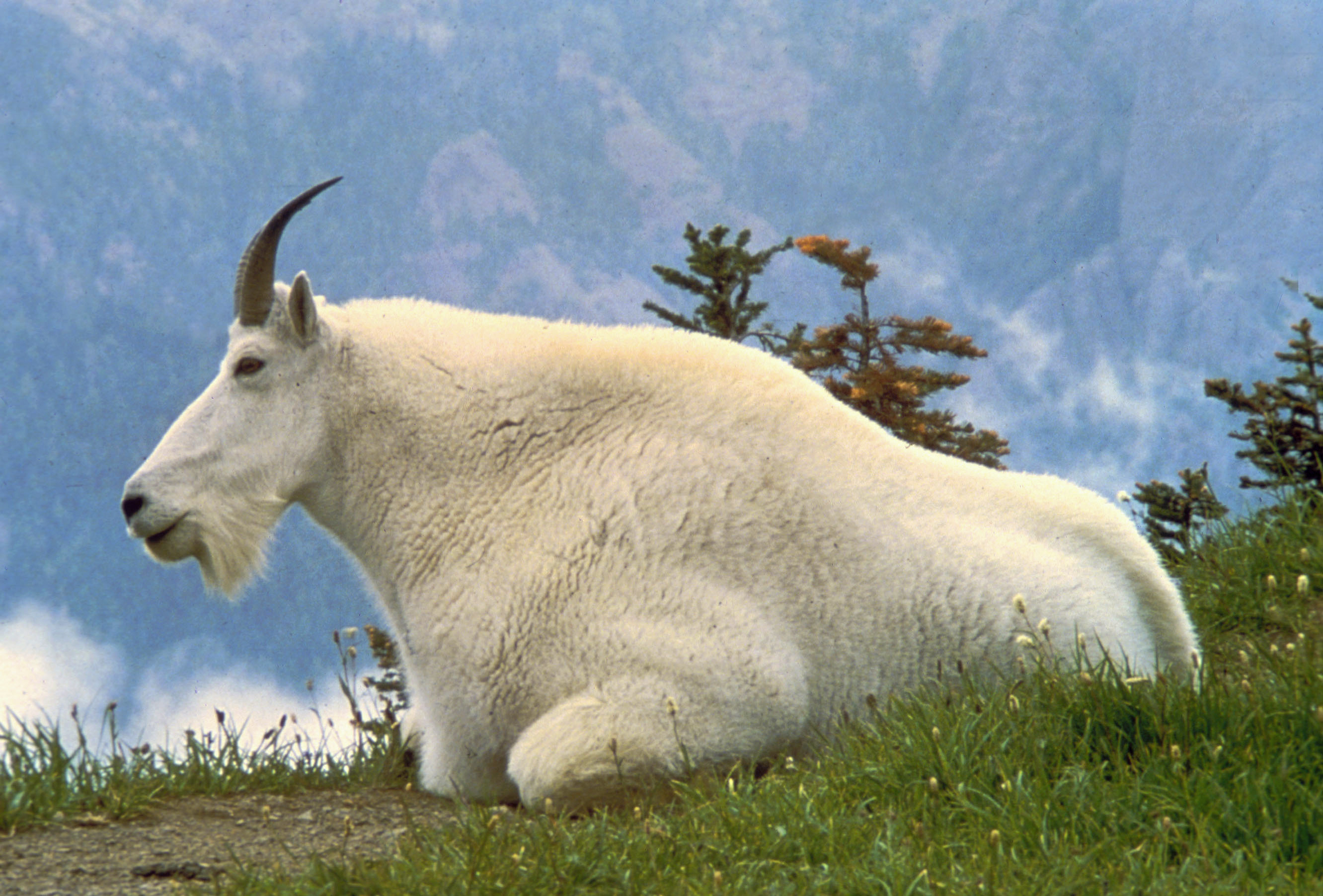
Mountain goat

Order: Artiodactyla, Family: Bovidae

Occurrence: High peaks and meadows - CL, I

The mountain goat (Oreamnos americanus), also known as the Rocky Mountain goat, is a large-hoofed mammal found only in North America. Despite its vernacular name, it is not a member of Capra, the genus of true goats. It resides at high elevations and is a sure-footed climber, often resting on rocky cliffs that predators cannot reach.

=== Mule deer ===
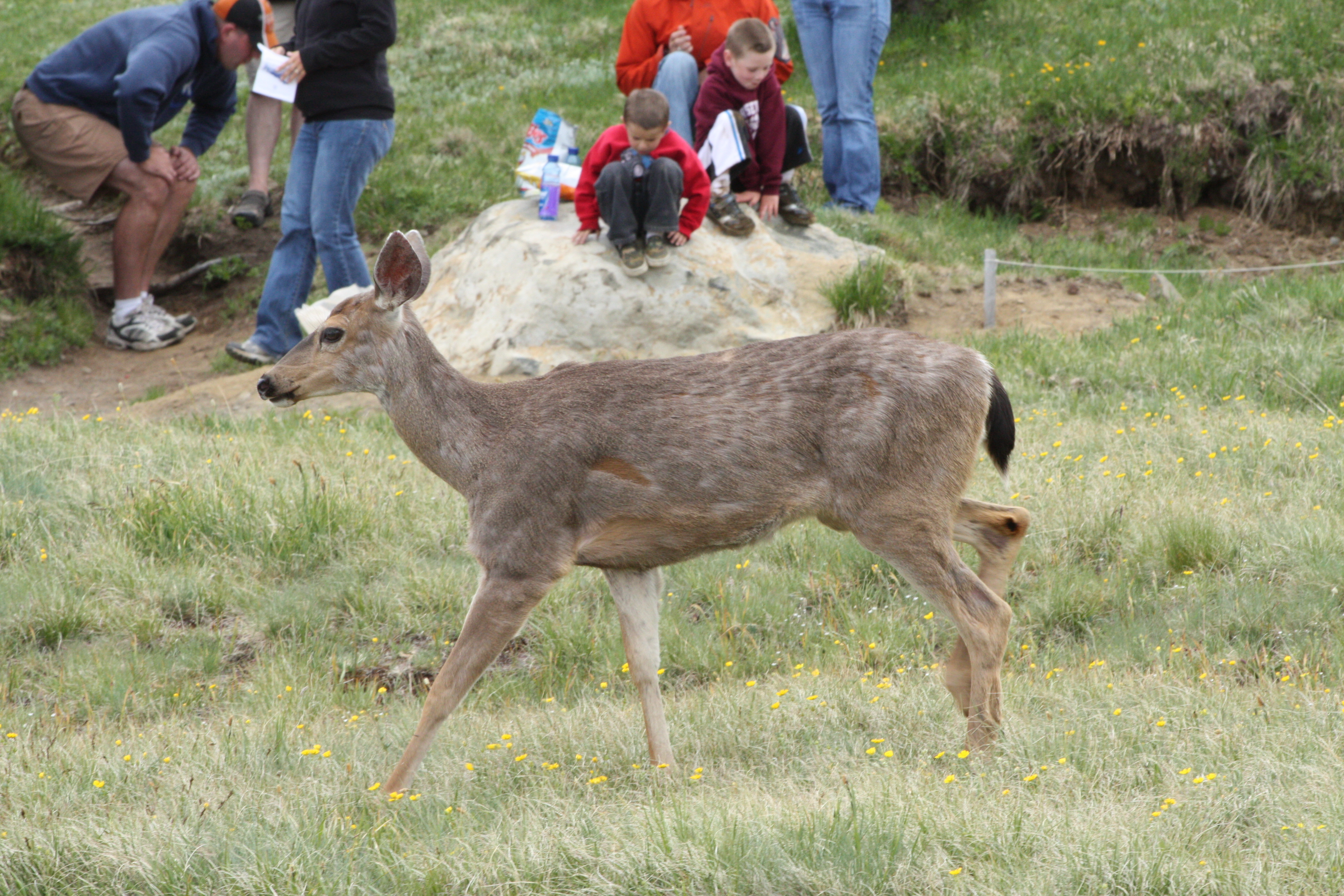
Black-tailed deer

The black-tailed deer sub-species (Odocoileus hemionus columbianus) is found in the park.

Order: Artiodactyla, Family: Cervidae

Occurrence: Open forests, meadows, often at high elevations - C

The mule deer (Odocoileus hemionus) is a deer whose habitat is in the western half of North America. It gets its name from its large mule-like ears. Adult male mule deer are called bucks, adult females are called does, and young of both sexes are called fawns. The black-tailed deer is considered by some a distinct species though it is classified as a subspecies of the mule deer. Unlike its cousin, the white-tailed deer, mule deer are generally more associated with the land west of the Missouri River. The most noticeable differences between whitetails and mule deer are the color of their tails and configuration of their antlers. The mule deer's tail is black tipped.

=== Gray wolf ===
Although native to the park, the gray wolf was extirpated from the park in the 19th century.

Order: Carnivora, Family: Canidae

Occurrence: Coniferous forests - E

Northwestern wolf is a subspecies of a gray wolf or grey wolf (Canis lupus), often known simply as the wolf which is the largest wild member of the family Canidae. It is an ice age survivor originating during the Late Pleistocene around 300,000 years ago. DNA sequencing and genetic drift studies reaffirm that the gray wolf shares a common ancestry with the domestic dog (Canis lupus familiaris). Although certain aspects of this conclusion have been questioned, the main body of evidence confirms it. A number of other gray wolf subspecies have been identified, though the actual number of subspecies is still open to discussion. Gray wolves are typically apex predators in the ecosystems they occupy.

=== Red fox ===
The red fox is an introduced species within the park.

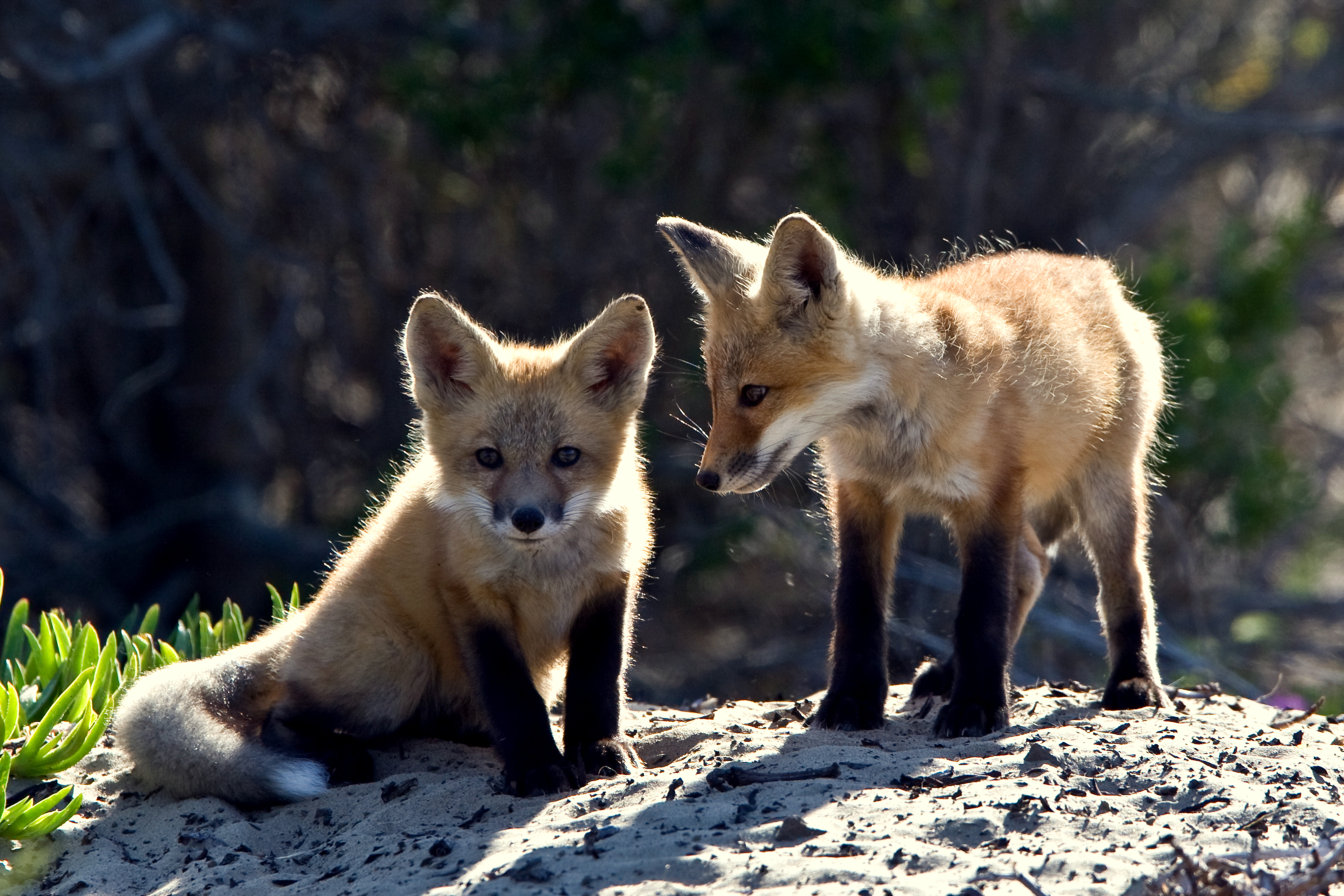
Red fox kits

Order: Carnivora, Family: Canidae

Occurrence: Grasslands, open forest - R, I

The red fox (Vulpes vulpes) is a small canid native to much of North America and Eurasia, as well as northern Africa. It is the most recognizable species of fox and in many areas it is referred to simply as "the fox". As its name suggests, its fur is predominantly reddish-brown, but there is a naturally occurring grey morph known as the "silver" fox. The red fox is by far the most widespread and abundant species of fox, found in almost every single habitat in the Northern Hemisphere, from the coastal marshes of United States, to the alpine tundras of Tibetan Plateau.

== Small mammals ==
=== Raccoons ===
Order: Carnivora Family: Procyonidae

- Raccoon, Procyon lotor, Open forests, stream bottoms - C

=== Badgers and weasels ===
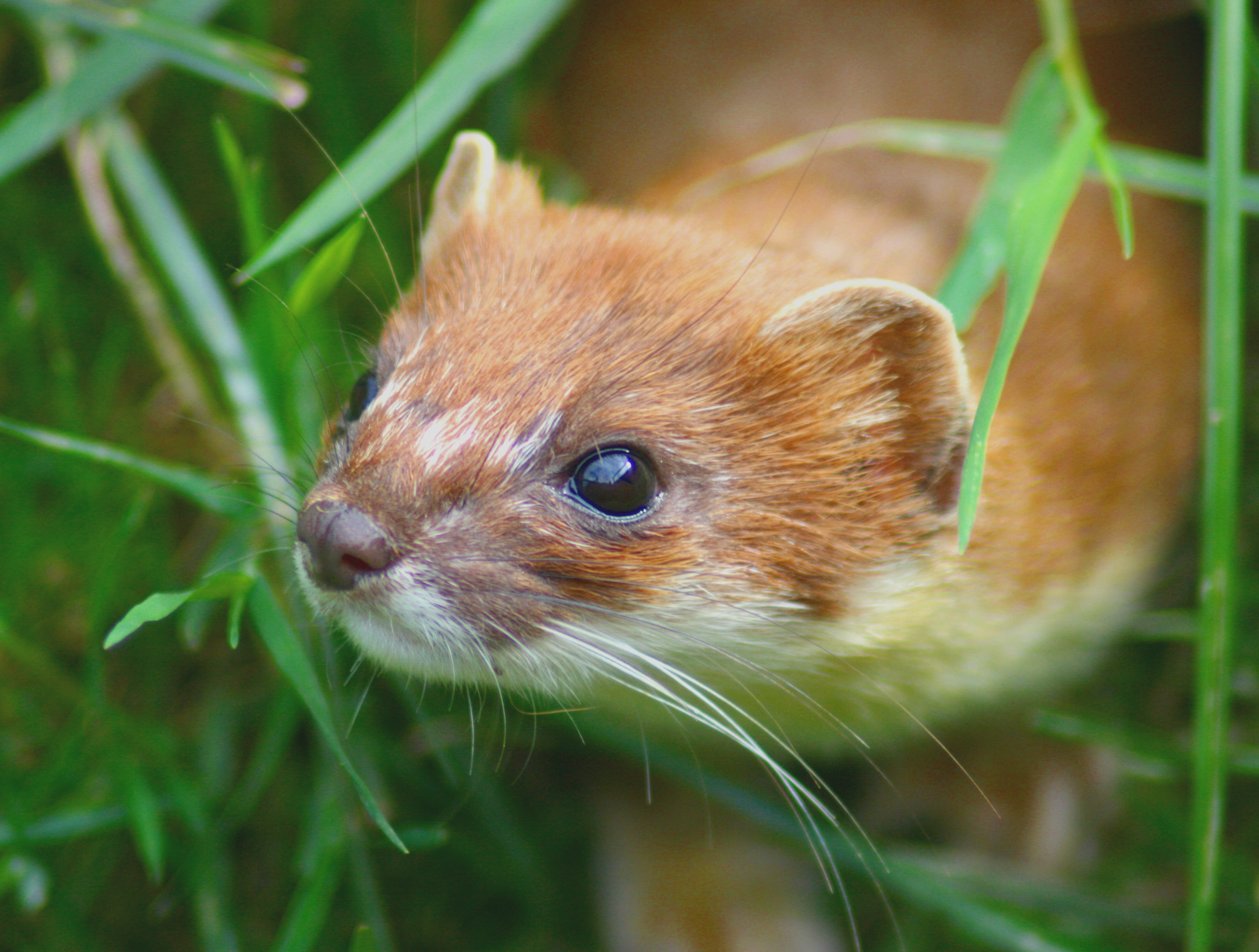
Short-tailed weasel

Order: Carnivora Family: Mustelidae

- North American river otter, Lontra canadensis, rivers, lakes, ponds - C
- Pacific marten, Martes caurina, coniferous forests - R
- Short-tailed weasel, Mustela richardsonii, coniferous forests and meadows - C, EN
- Long-tailed weasel, Neogale frenata, open forests and meadows - C
- American mink, Neogale vison, creek and lake edges - C
- Fisher, Pekania pennanti, coniferous forests (reintroduced) - R

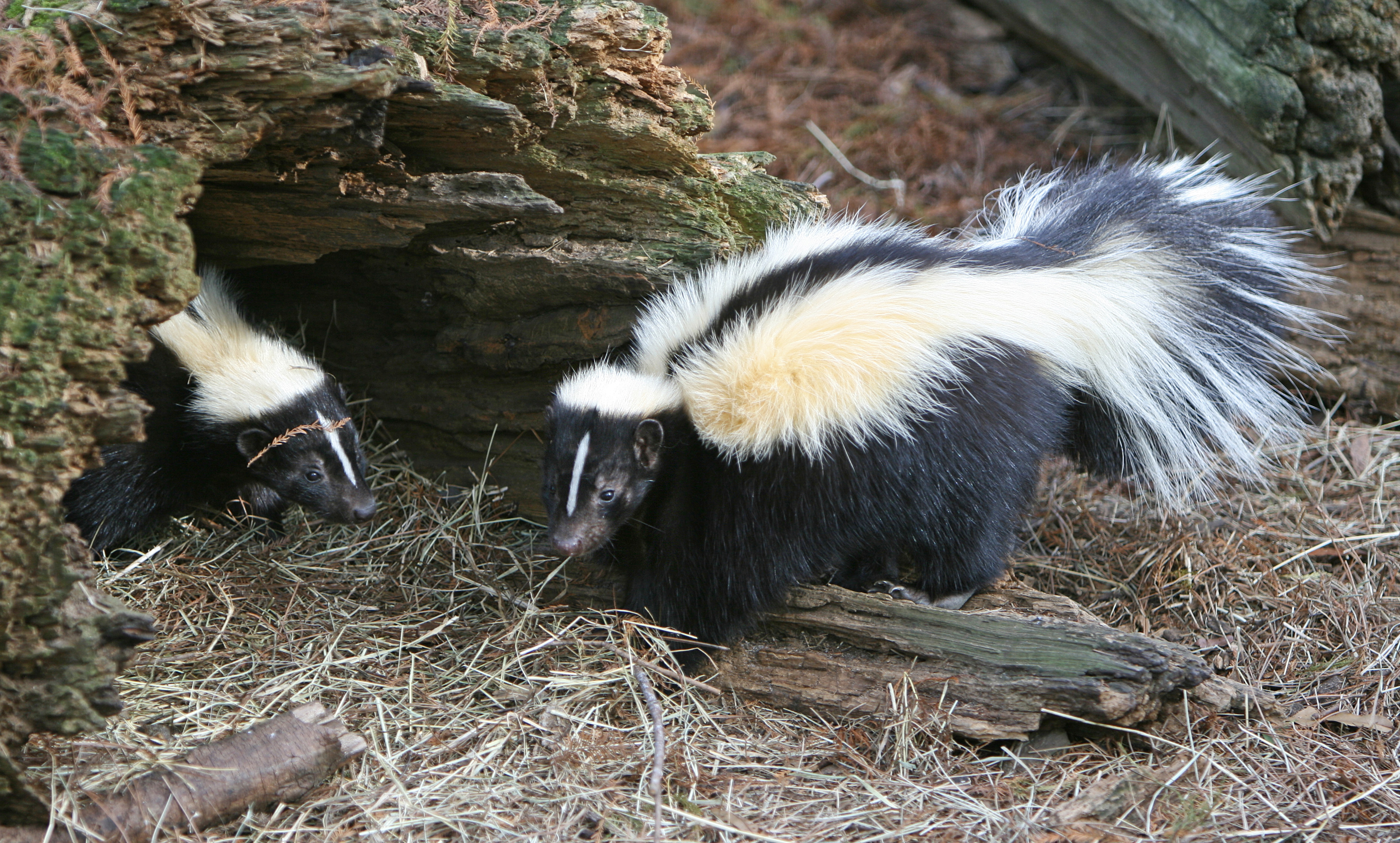
Skunks

=== Skunks ===
Order: Carnivora Family: Mephitidae

- Striped skunk, Mephitis mephitis, open forests and grasslands - C
- Western spotted skunk, Spilogale gracilis, mixed woodlands, open areas, and farmlands - CL

=== Hares and rabbits ===
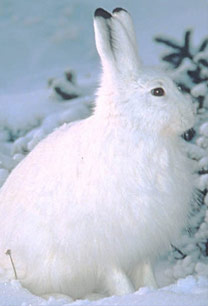
Snowshoe hare

Order: Lagomorpha Family: Leporidae

- Snowshoe hare, Lepus americanus, coniferous forests - C

=== Shrews ===
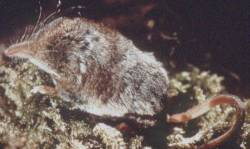
Masked shrew

Order: Soricomorpha Family: Soricidae

- Dusky shrew, Sorex monticolus, higher elevation coniferous forests - C
- Masked shrew, Sorex cinereus, coniferous forests, meadows, ponds and stream edges - R
- American water shrew, Sorex palustris, stream edges - U
- Vagrant shrew, Sorex vagrans, moist forests and grasslands, marsh and stream edges - C
- Trowbridge's shrew, Sorex trowbridgii, - C
- Pacific marsh shrew, Sorex bendirii, near aquatic habitats - C

=== Moles ===
Order: Soricomorpha Family: Talpidae

- American shrew-mole, Neurotrichus gibbsii, damp forested or bushy areas - CL
- Townsend's mole, Scapanus townsendii, open lowland and wooded areas - A
  - Olympic snow mole, Scapanus townsendii olympicus is one subspecies found in the park -- CL, EN
- Coast mole, Scapanus orarius, forested and open areas with moist soils - C

=== Beaver ===
Order: Rodentia Family: Castoridae

- Beaver, Castor canadensis, ponds, streams, lakes - CL

Family: Aplodontiidae

- Mountain beaver, Aplodontia rufa, deciduous and coniferous forests - C

=== Squirrels ===
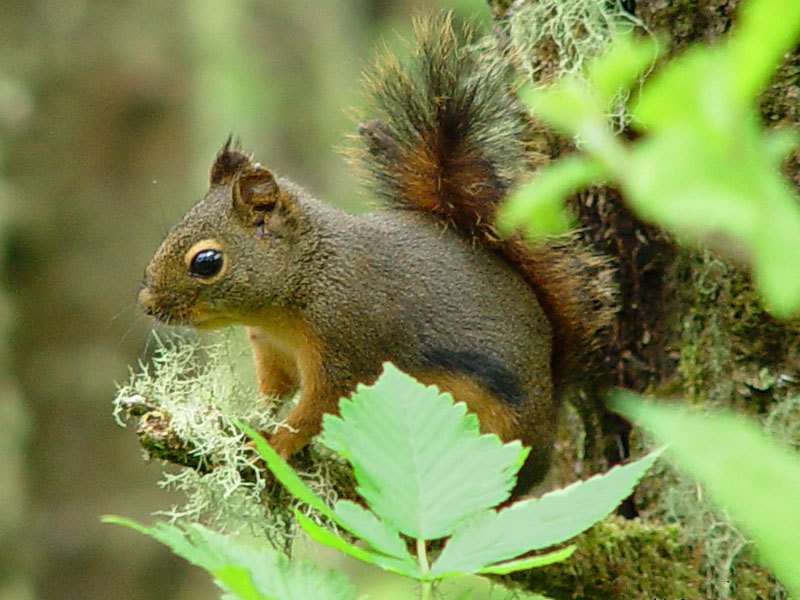
Douglas squirrel

Order: Rodentia Family: Sciuridae

- Douglas squirrel, Tamiasciurus douglasi, coniferous forests - C
- Townsend's chipmunk, Neotamias townsendii, open forests, brushy, rocky areas - C
- Olympic chipmunk, Neotamias amoenus caunnus, open forests, brushy, rocky areas - CL, EN
- Northern flying squirrel, Glaucomys sabrinus, coniferous forests, nocturnal - C
- Olympic marmot, Marmota olympus, alpine and subalpine meadows and talus slopes - CL, EN

=== Pocket gophers ===
Order: Rodentia Family: Geomyidae

- Mazama pocket gopher, Thomomys mazama, meadows - U, EN

=== Rats ===
Order: Rodentia Family: Muridae

- Norway rat, Rattus norvegicus, CL, I
- Black rat, Rattus rattus, CL, I

=== Mice ===
Order: Rodentia Family: Cricetidae

- Keen's mouse, Peromyscus keeni, forests, grasslands, alpine meadows - C

=== Jumping mice ===
Order: Rodentia Family: Dipodidae

- Pacific jumping mouse, Zapus trinotatus, grasslands, swamps - C

=== Muskrats, voles and woodrats ===
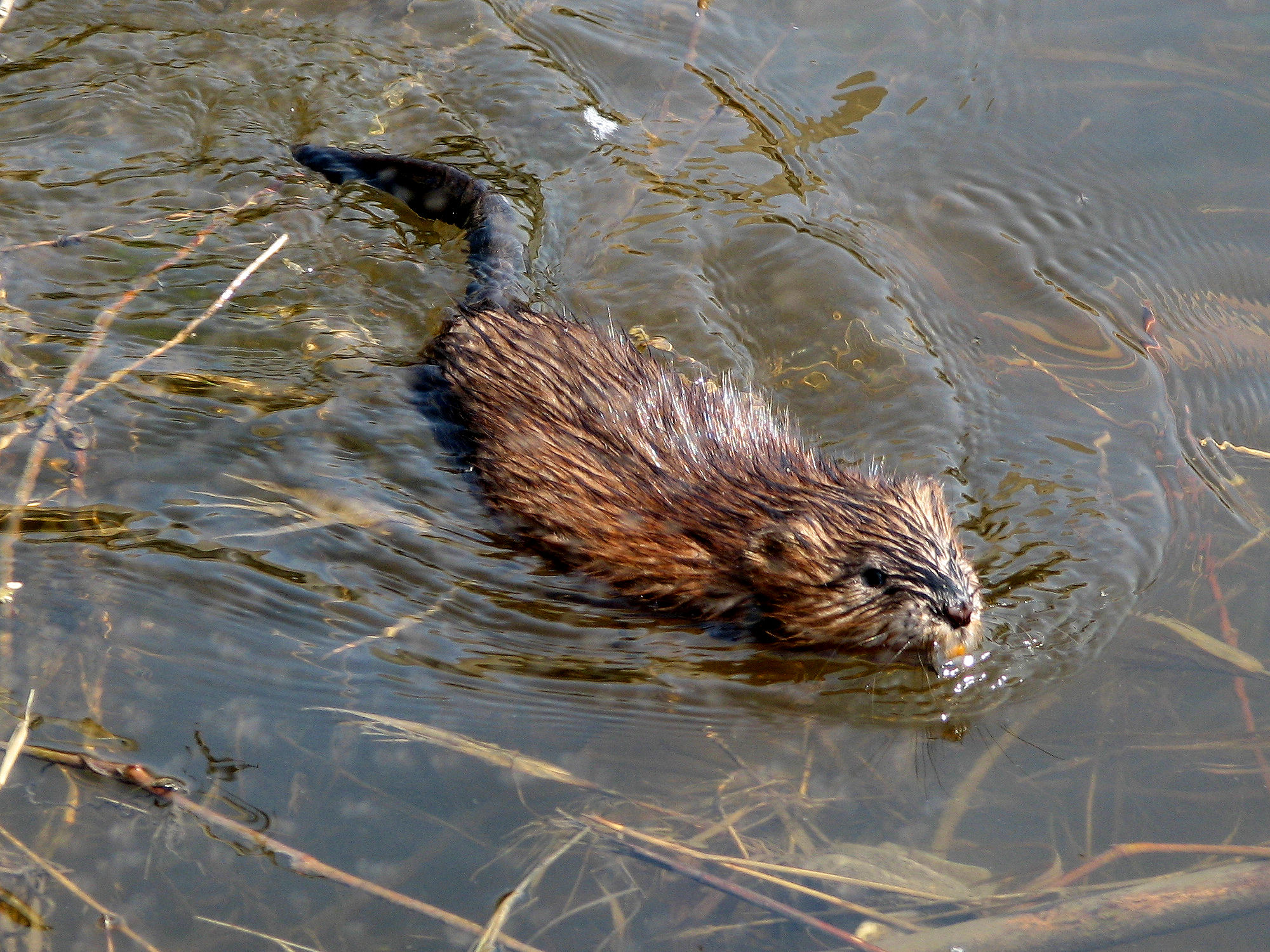
Muskrat

Order: Rodentia Family: Cricetidae

- Muskrat, Ondatra zibethicus, streams, lakes, marshy areas - CL
- Western heather vole, Phenacomys intermedius, coniferous forests, alpine meadows - CL
- Long-tailed vole, Microtus longicaudus, coniferous forests, grasslands - U
- Southern red-backed vole, Myodes gapperi, coniferous forests - C
- Townsend's vole Microtus townsendii, grasslands - C
- Bushy-tailed woodrat, Neotoma cinerea, rocky areas, old buildings - CL

=== Porcupines ===
Order: Rodentia Family: Erethizontidae

- North American porcupine, Erethizon dorsatum, coniferous forests, R

=== Bats ===
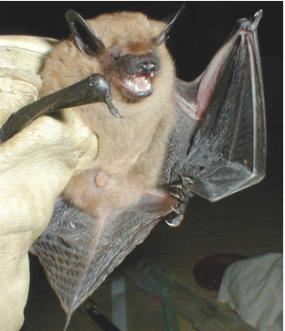
Big brown bat

Order: Chiroptera Family: Vespertilionidae

- Big brown bat, Eptesicus fuscus, coniferous forests, often around buildings, caves - U
- Hoary bat, Lasiurus cinereus, coniferous forests, mostly nocturnal - U
- Little brown bat, Myotis lucifugus, coniferous forests, often around buildings, caves, nocturnal - U
- Long-eared bat, Myotis evotis, coniferous forests, meadows, nocturnal - R
- Long-legged bat, Myotis volans, coniferous forests, meadows, nocturnal - R
- Silver-haired bat, Lasionycteris noctivagans, coniferous forests, meadows, nocturnal - U
- Yuma myotis, Myotis yumanensis - C
- Keen's myotis, Myotis keenii - R
- California myotis, Myotis californicus - U
- Fringed myotis, Myotis thysanodes - U
- Townsend's big-eared bat, Corynorhinus townsendii - R

== Marine mammals ==
The coastal portion of Olympic National Park contains 73 miles (117 km) of Pacific Ocean shoreline and abuts the Olympic Coast National Marine Sanctuary. The following marine mammals are found in the waters off the beaches of the coastal section of the park.

- Sea otter, Enhydra lutris - CL
- River otter, Lutra canadensis - C (rocky intertidal)
- Harbor seal, Phoca vitulina - A
- Northern fur seal, Callorhinus ursinus - O
- Steller's sea lion, Eumetopias jubatus - U
- California sea lion, Zalophus californianus - U
- Northern elephant seal, Mirounga angustirostris - R
- Gray whale, Eschrichtius robustus - C (spring and fall)
- Minke whale, Balaenoptera acutorostrata - U (summer and fall)
- Humpback whale, Megaptera novaeangliae - U (fall)
- Harbor porpoise, Phocoena phocoena - CL (summer)
- Orca or killer whale, Orcinus orca - U (summer and fall)
- Dall's porpoise, Phocoenoides dalli - U
- Pacific white-sided dolphin, Sagmatias obliquidens - U
