= List of snakes of Georgia (U.S. state) =

This list needs pictures and descriptions for each snake listed to fit the goals of the snake Project

== Snakes ==
=== Non-venomous ===
Worm snake (Carphophis amoenus). Small dark fossorial snake with flat indistinct head, and smooth scales.

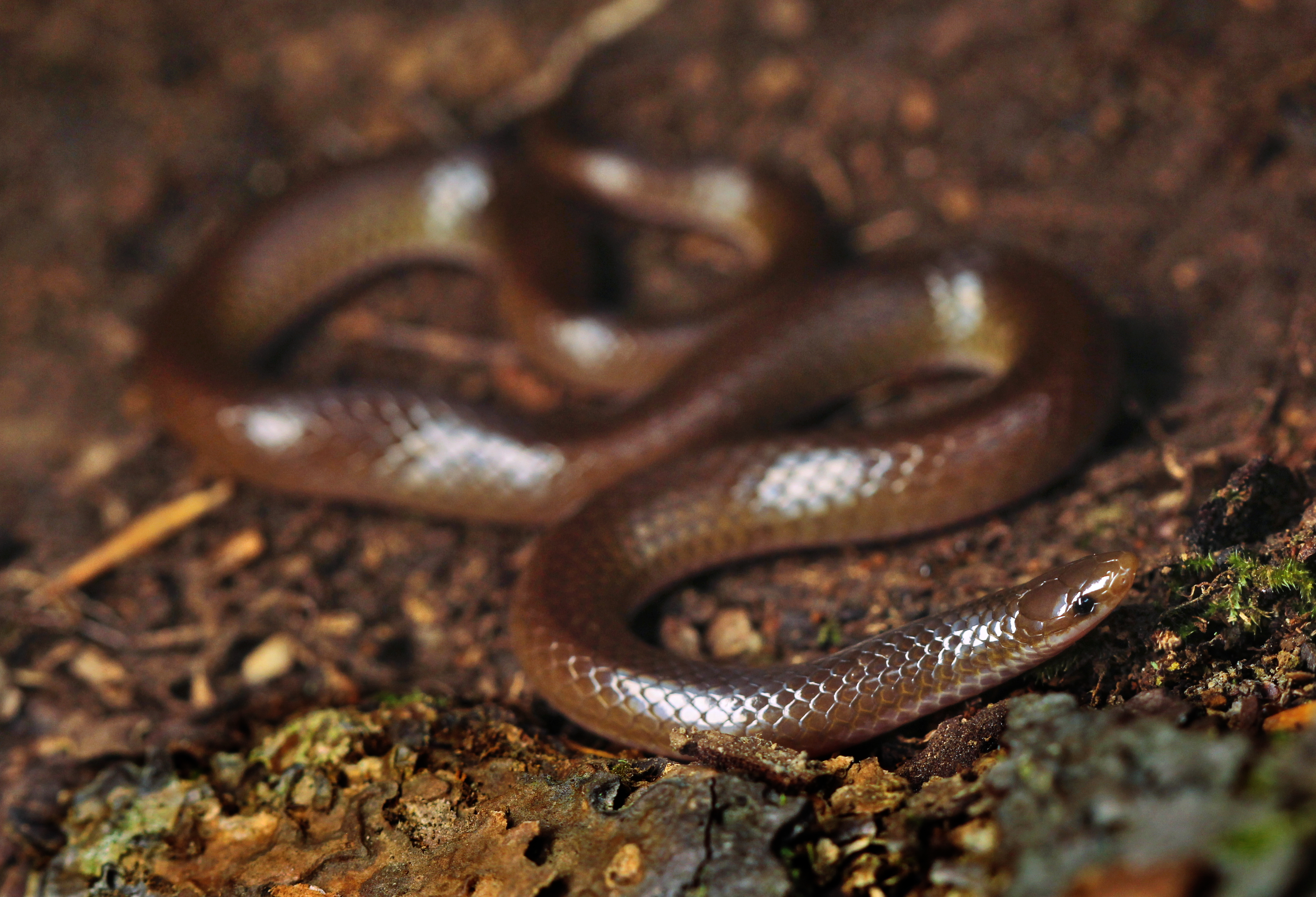

Scarlet snake (Cemophora coccinea). Bright red, white, and black bands that do not extend around the belly. Black bands surround the white, touching the red. Tip of nose is red.

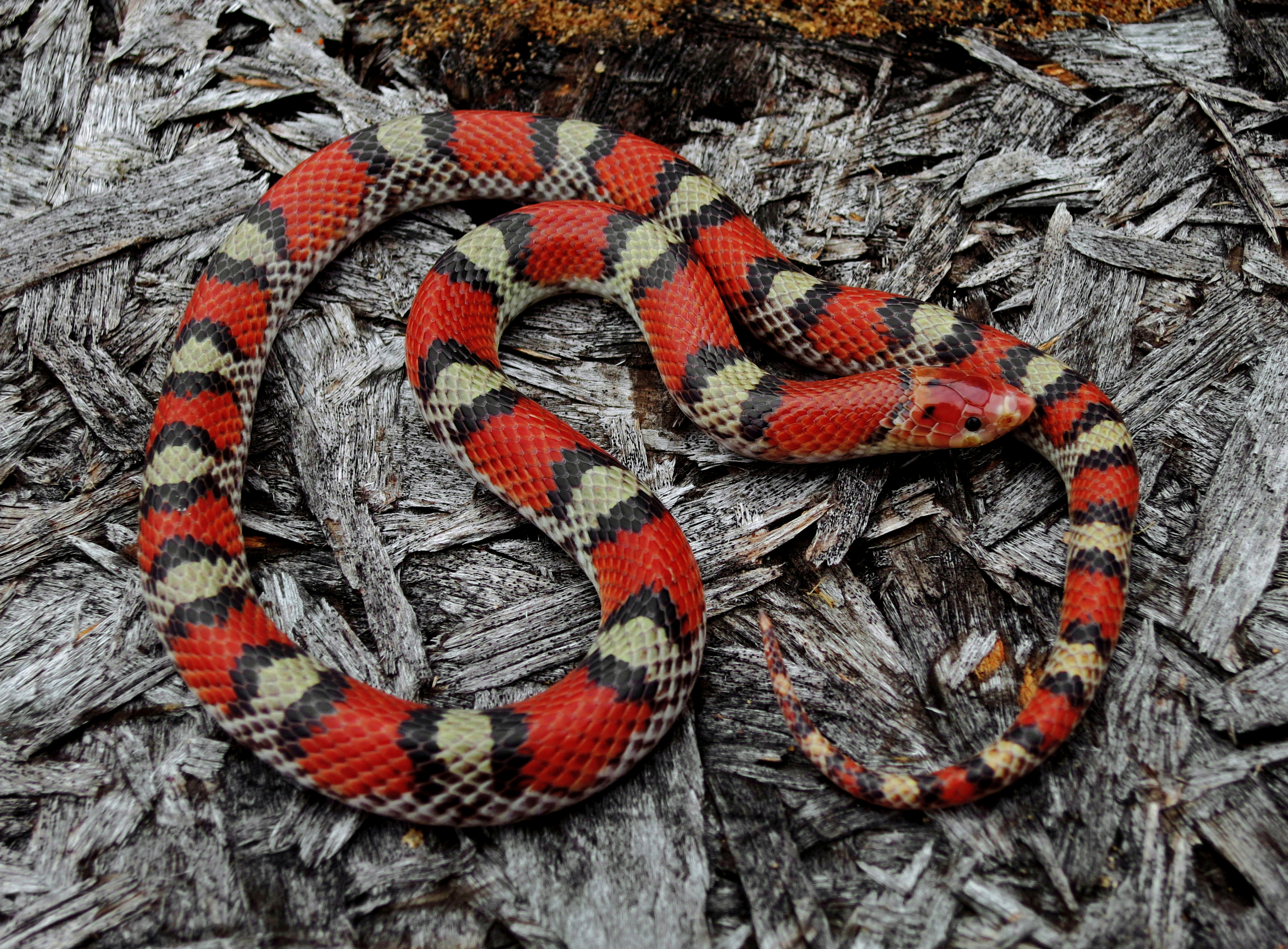

Black racer (Coluber constrictor). Adults are long, thin, and entirely black except for a gray belly and white lips and neck. Smooth scales. Juveniles are heavily patterns with dark dorsal saddles and lateral blotches.

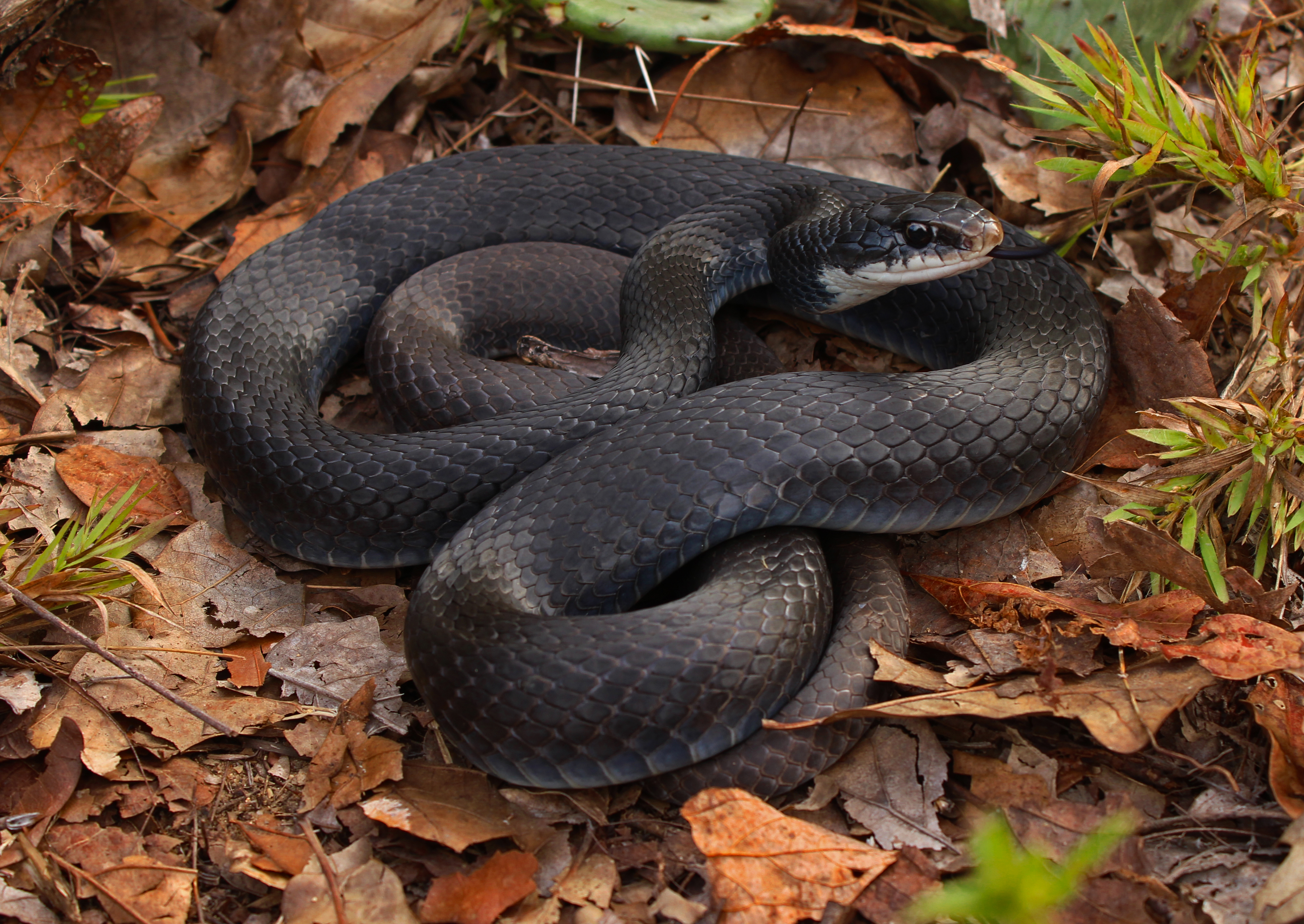

Ringneck snake (Diadophis punctatus). Small snake, dark gray with bright yellow collar. Belly is bright yellow with rows of black spots.

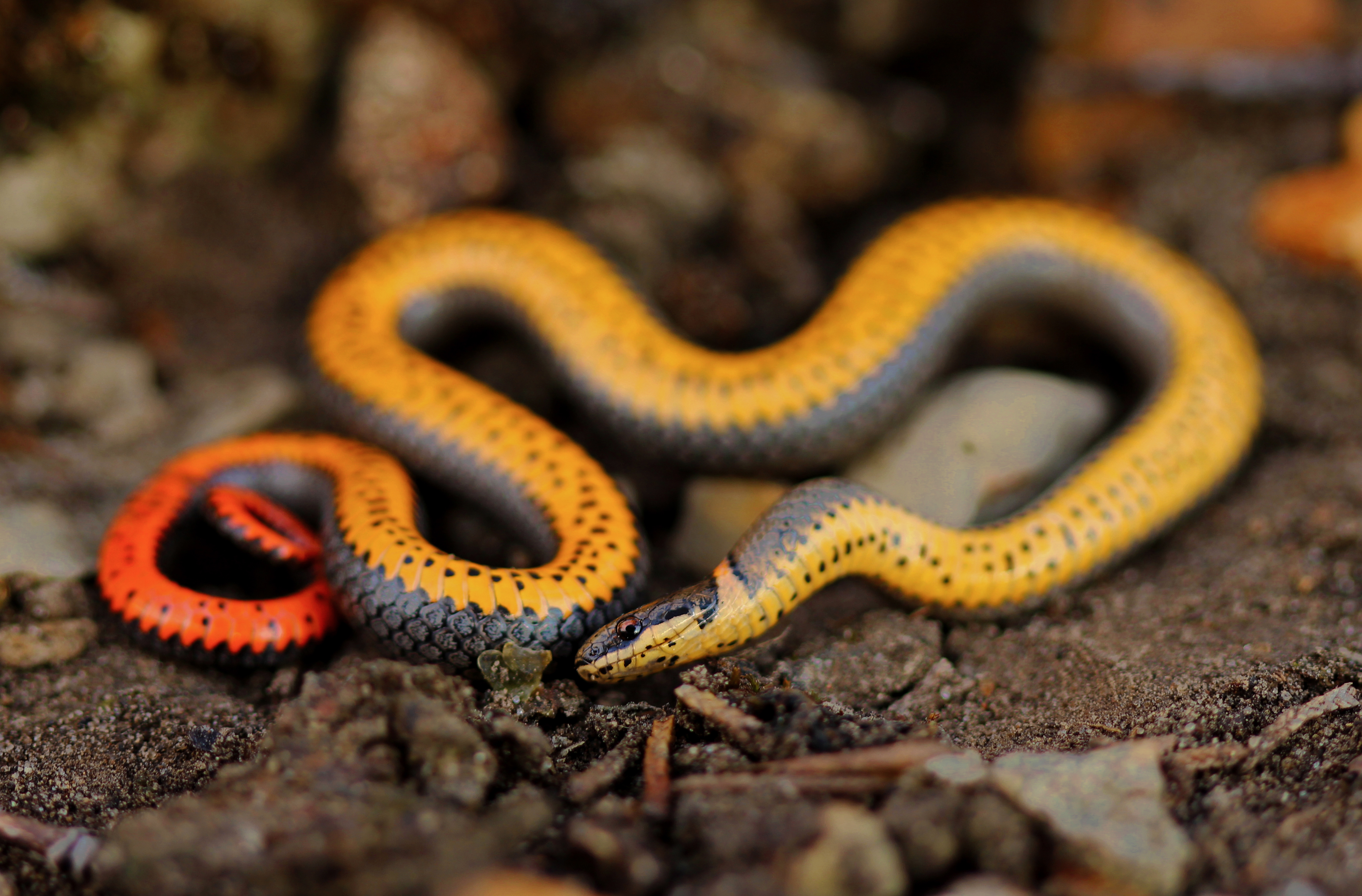

Indigo snake (Drymarchon couperi). Large, thick-bodied snake, almost entirely black with reddish facial highlights.

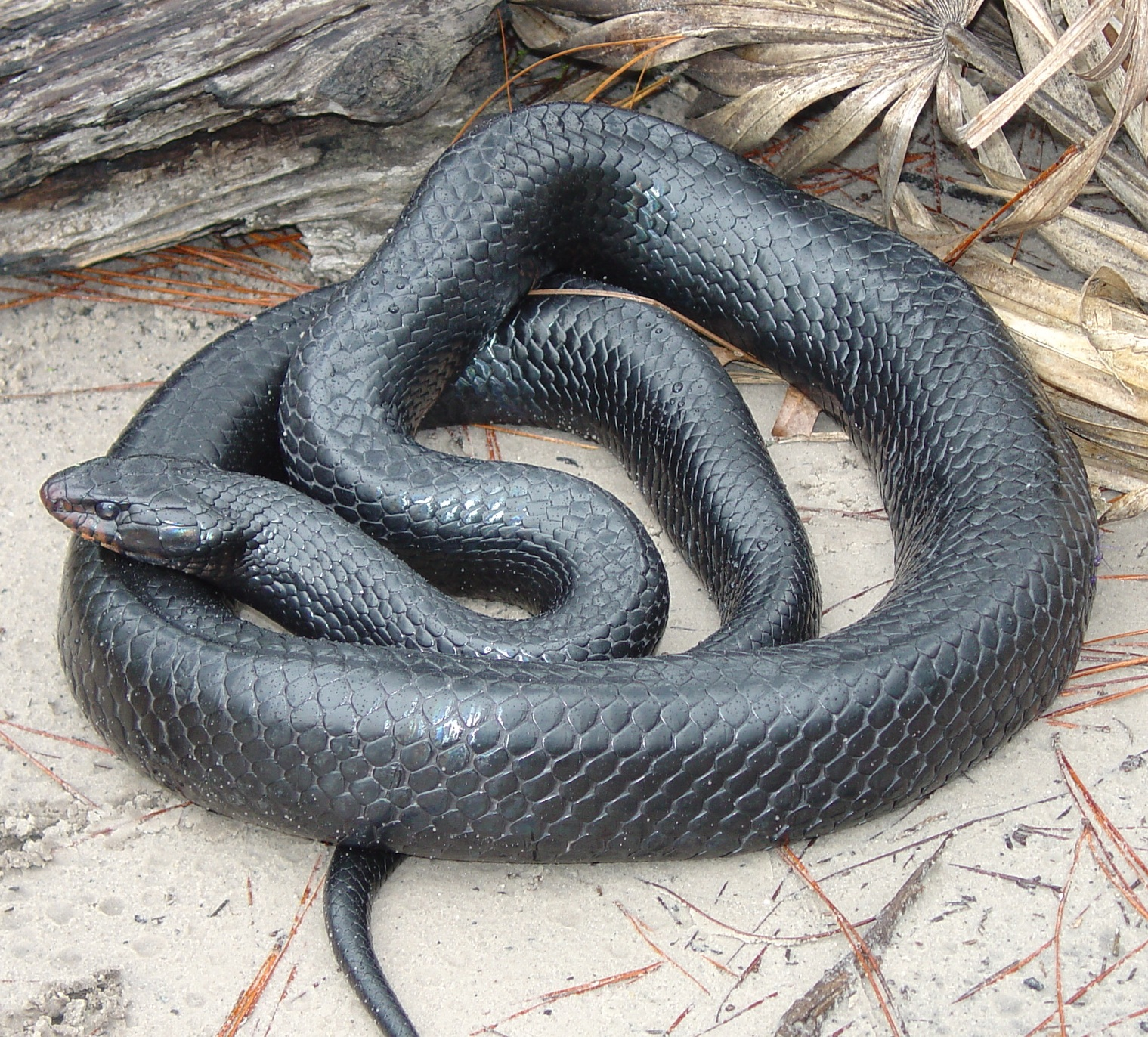

Corn snake (Pantherophis guttatus). Adults are bright orange, with darker orange dorsal saddles and side blotches. Head has pattern resembling an arrow. Juvenile coloration is less saturated. Barely keeled scales.

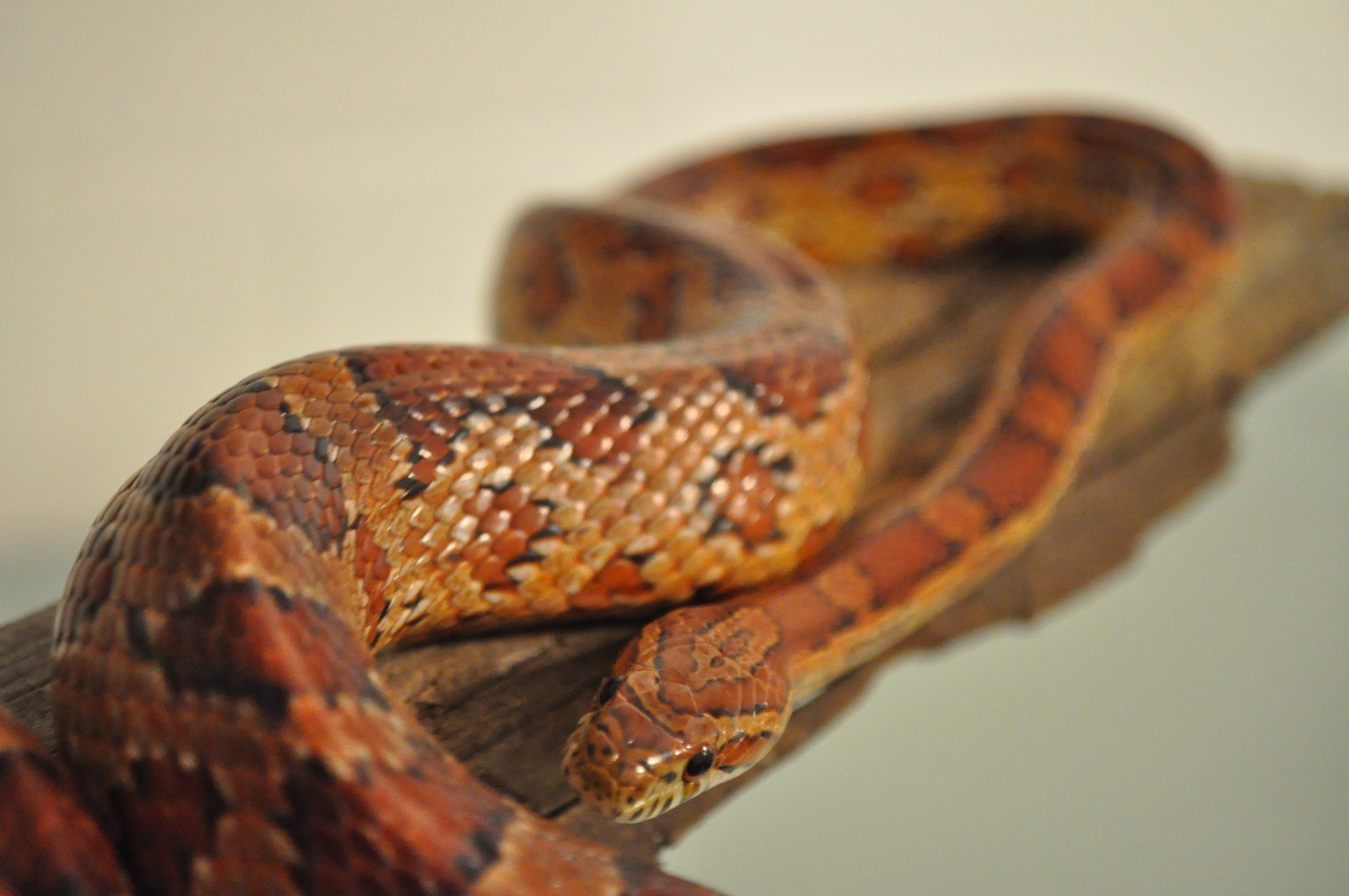

Central ratsnake (Pantherophis alleghaniensis). Found from the Piedmont westward. Heavily patterned as juveniles, resembling juvenile corn snakes, but with no arrow pattern on head. Pattern fades into adulthood, becoming black. Slightly keeled scales distinguishes them from racers.

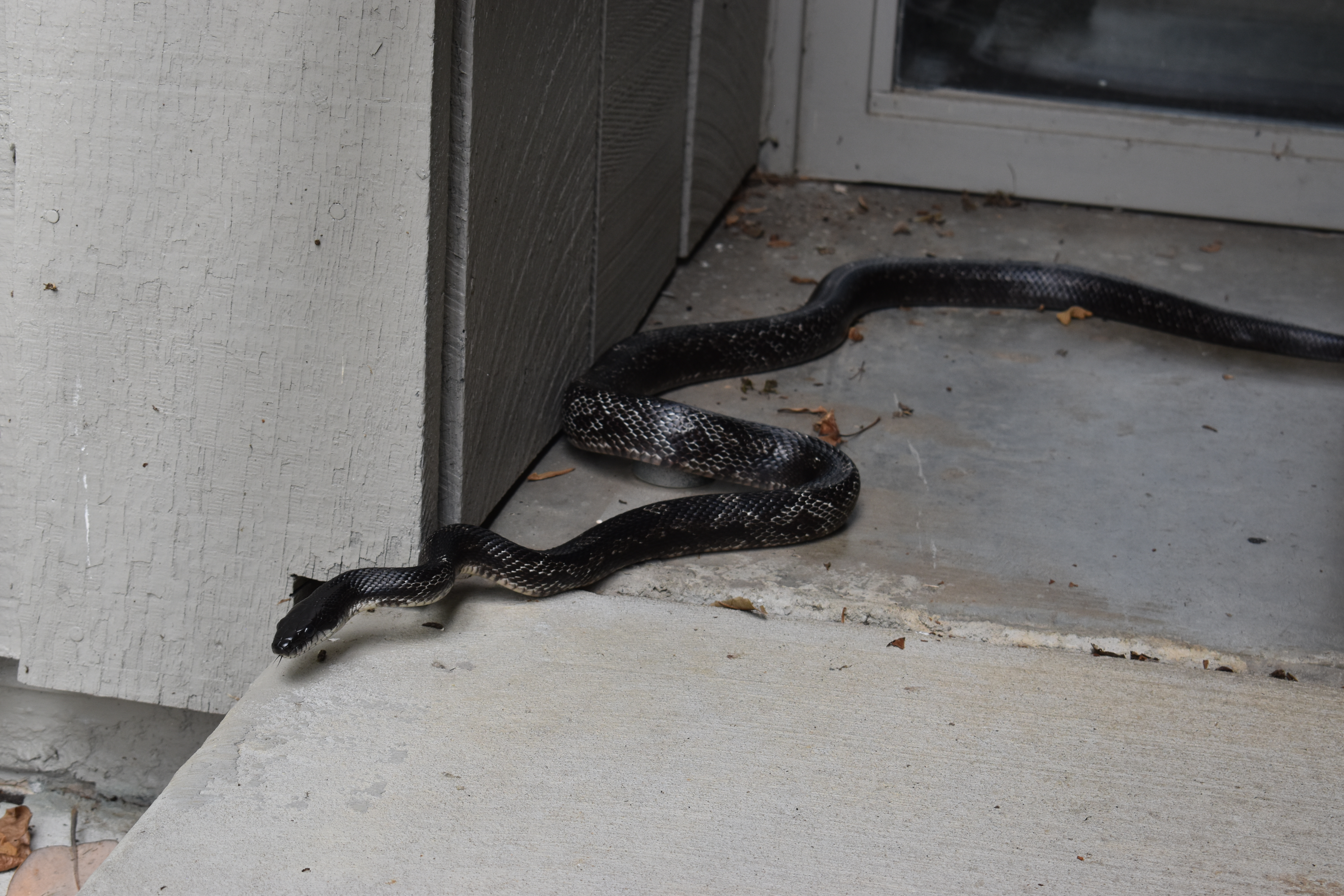

Yellow ratsnake (Pantherophis quadrivittatus). Found on coastal plain. Light background with four longitudinal stripes. Pattern often fades entirely in northern populations, resembling central rat snakes. Juveniles resemble other Pantherophis, but no head arrow pattern. Slightly keeled scales.

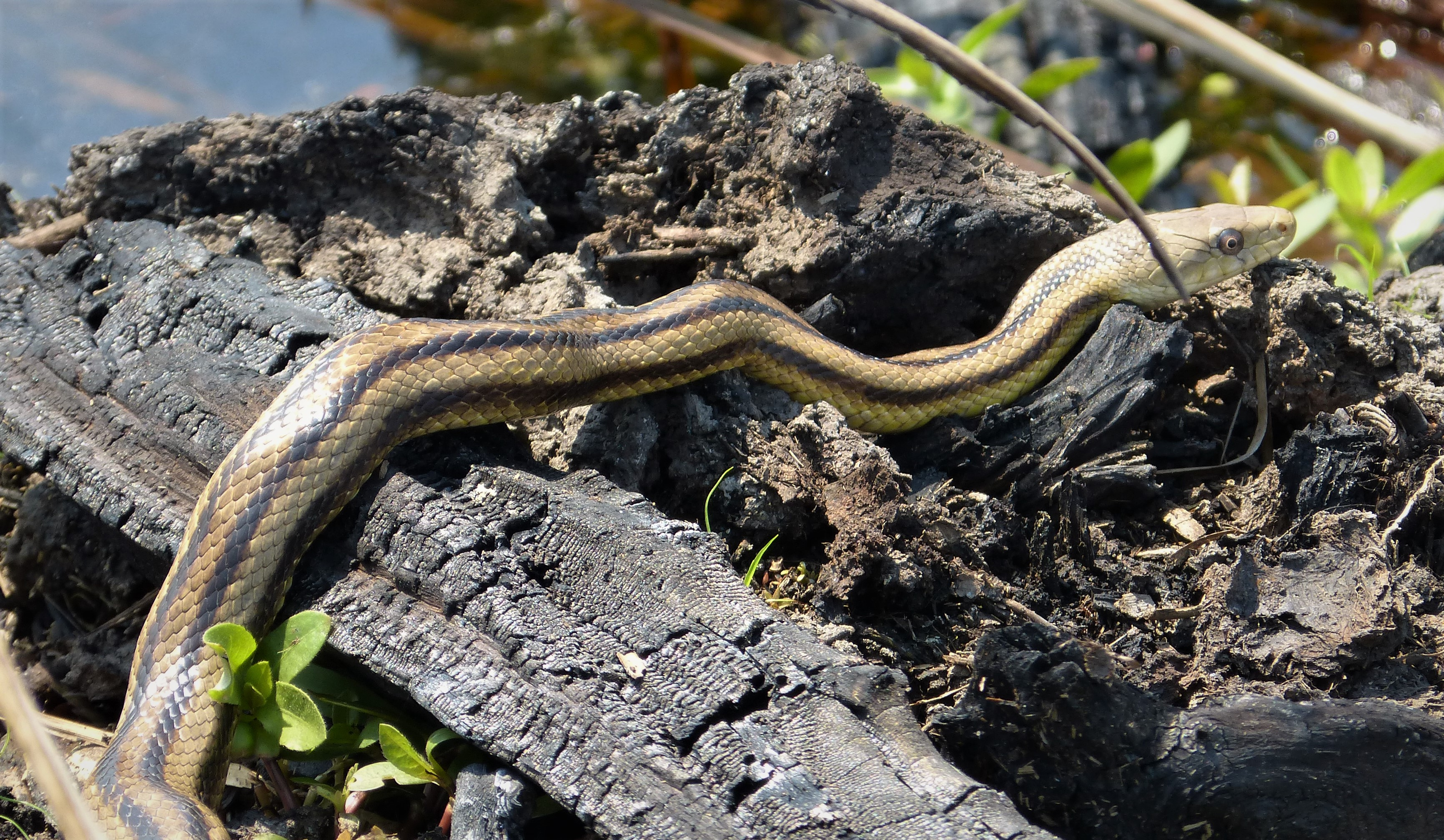

Mud snake (Farancia abacura). Thick-bodied aquatic snake. Black dorsal surface with red lateral blotches. Belly is red with black barring.

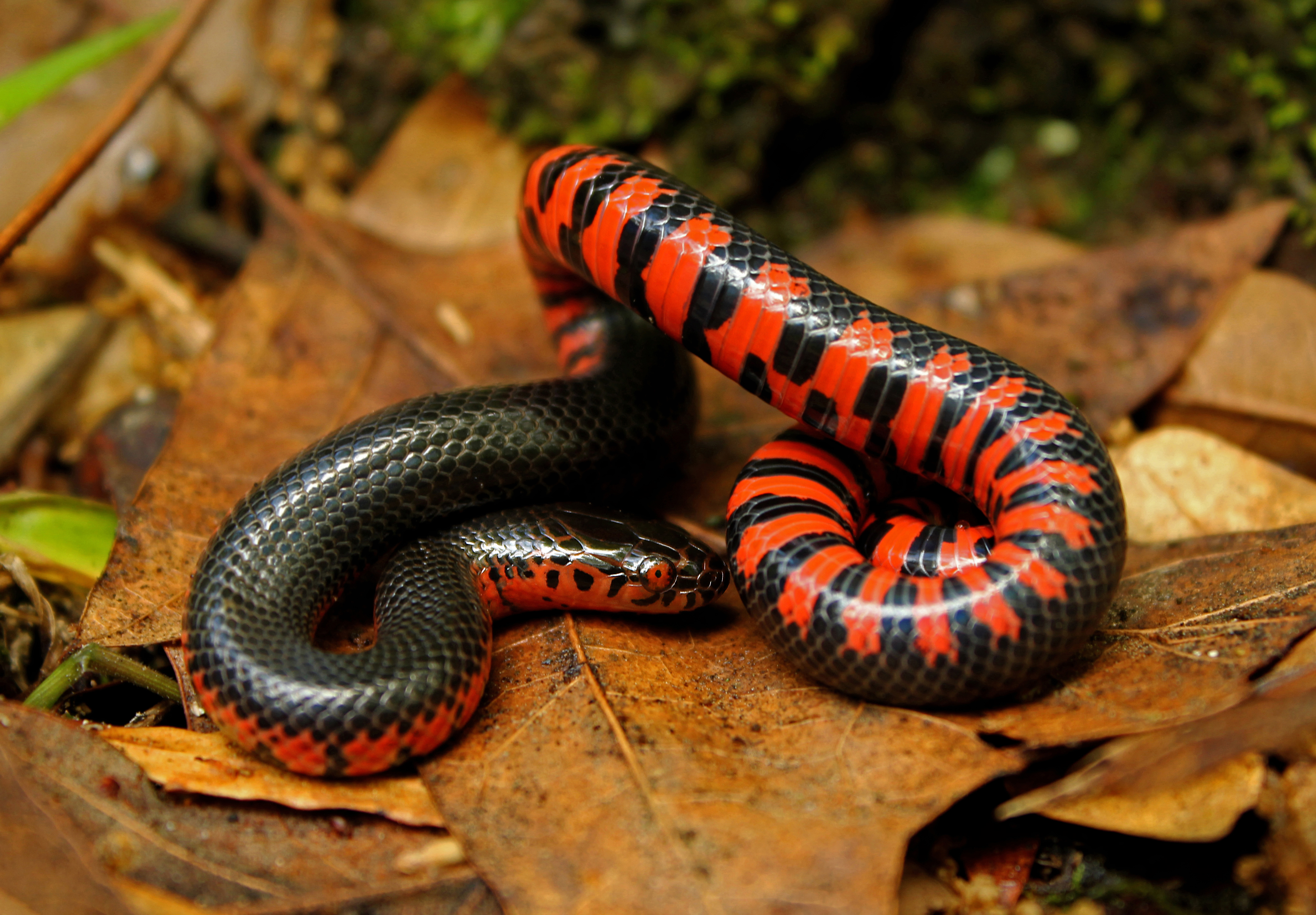

Rainbow snake (Farancia erytrogramma). Thick-bodied aquatic snake. Iridescent dorsal surface with yellow lateral stripe. Belly is red with black splotches.

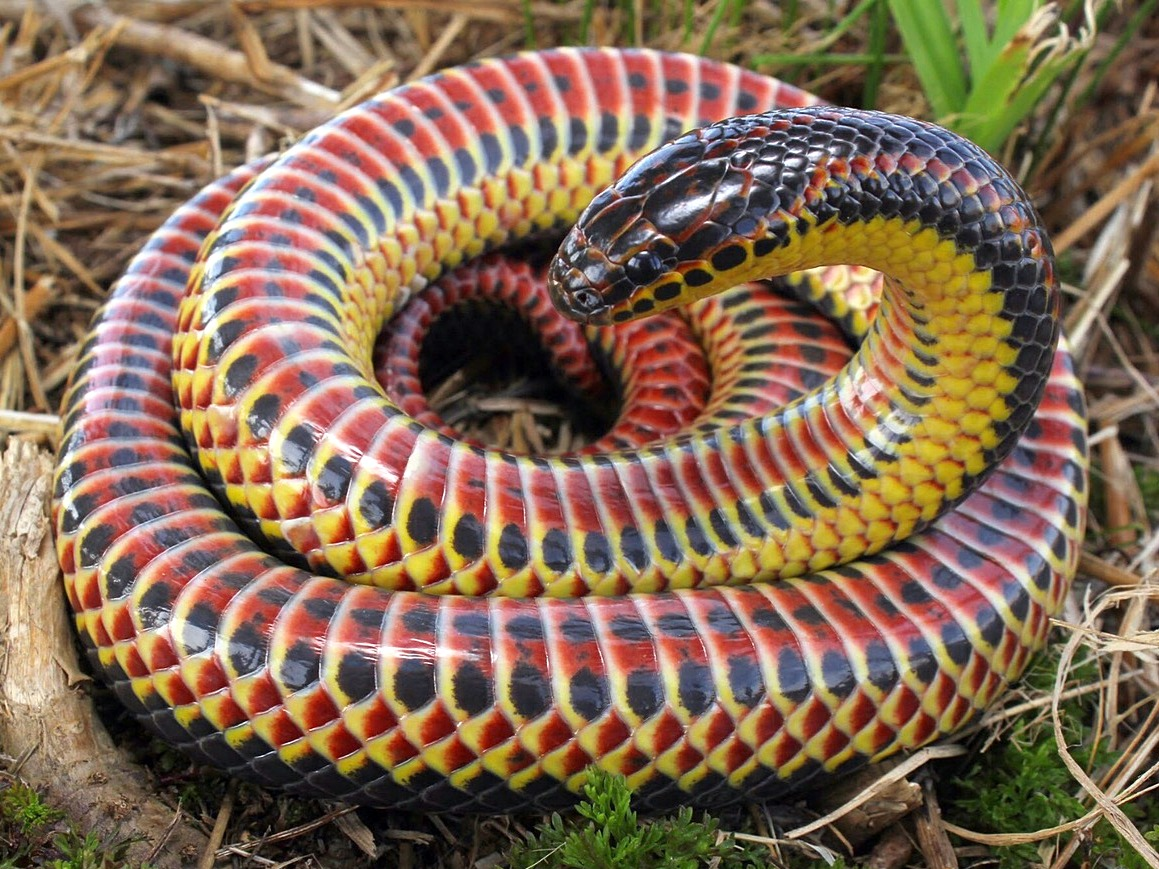

Eastern hognose snake (Heterodon platirhinos). Extremely variable in pattern and coloration. Upturned nose. Splays its neck like a cobra when threatened, but also plays dead by exposing its belly.

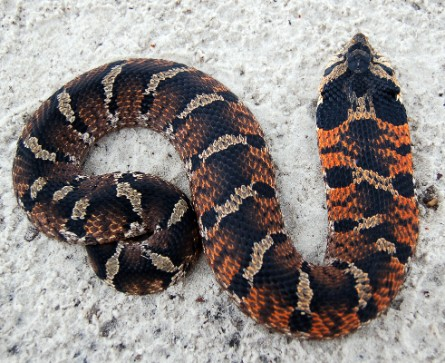

Southern hognose snake (Heterodon simus). Pattern is consistent, light brown with lines of dark blotches. Nose is even more upturned that in eastern hognose. Engages in same defensive behaviors as eastern hognose.

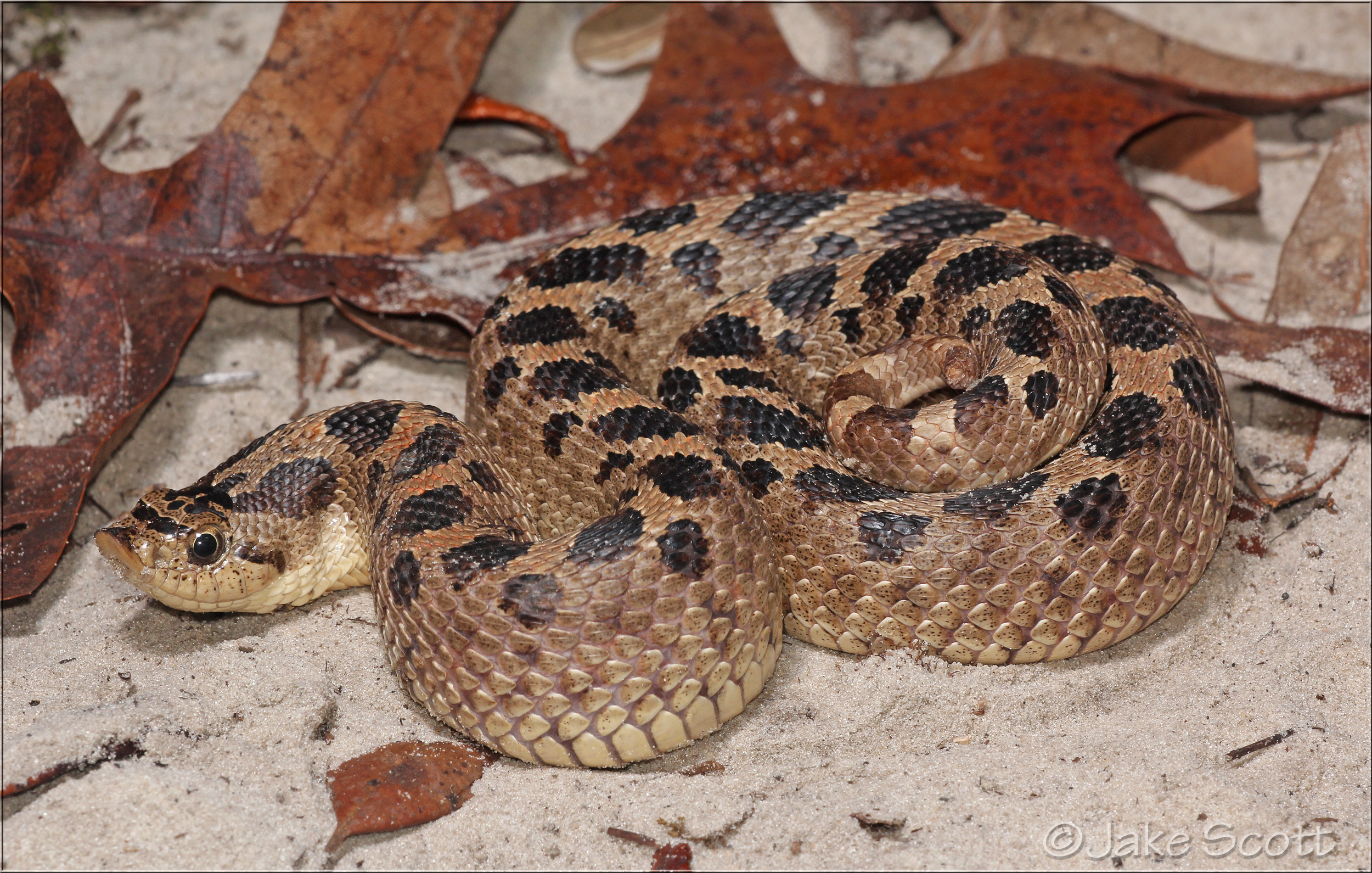

Mole kingsnake (Lampropeltis rhombomaculata). Brownish with darker dorsal and lateral splotches. Smooth scales. Pattern fades with age.

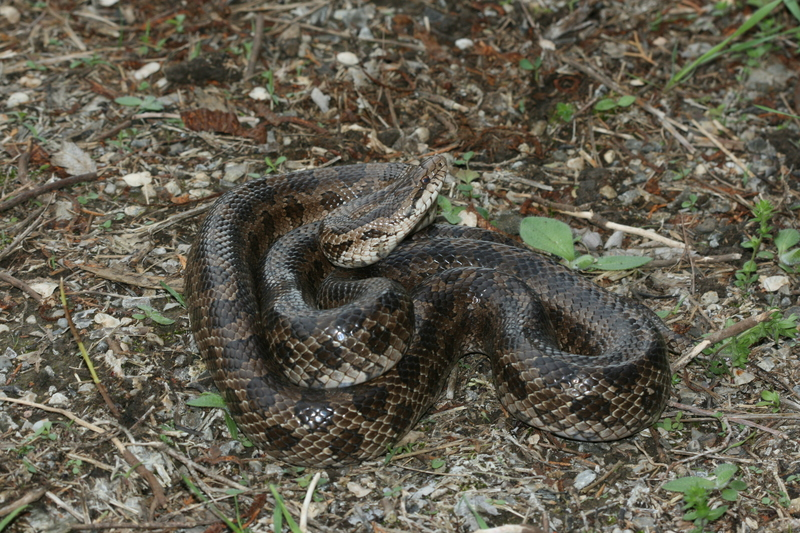

Eastern kingsnake (Lampropeltis getula). Black with tan-white chain pattern. Some populations are entirely black.

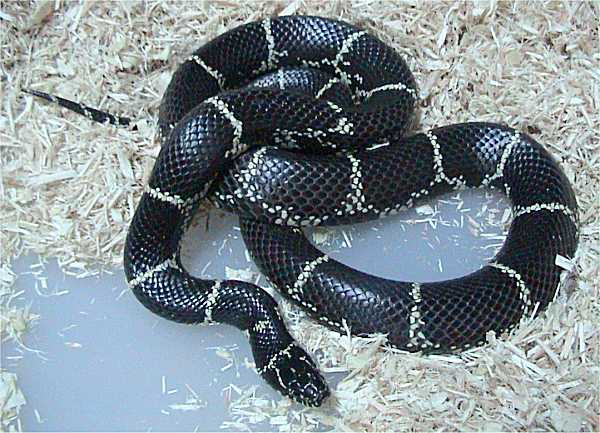

Milk snake (Lampropeltis triangulum). Brownish with large reddish-brown dorsal blotches with black outlines. Smaller but similar lateral blotches. Smooth scales.

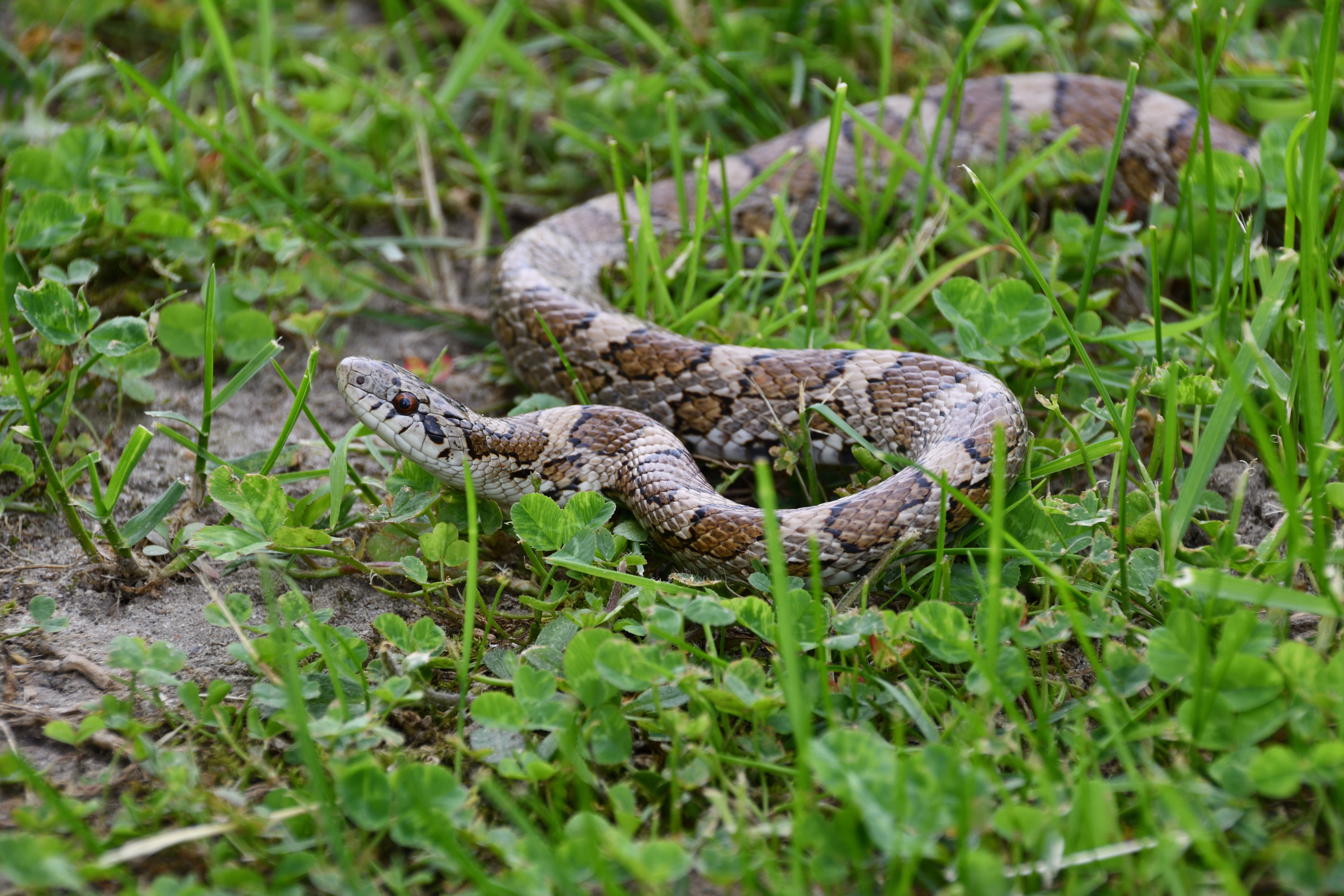

Scarlet kingsnake (Lampropeltis elapsoides). Bright red with yellow-white and black bands. Black bands surround the yellow bands, touching the red. Bands extend across the belly. Nose is red.

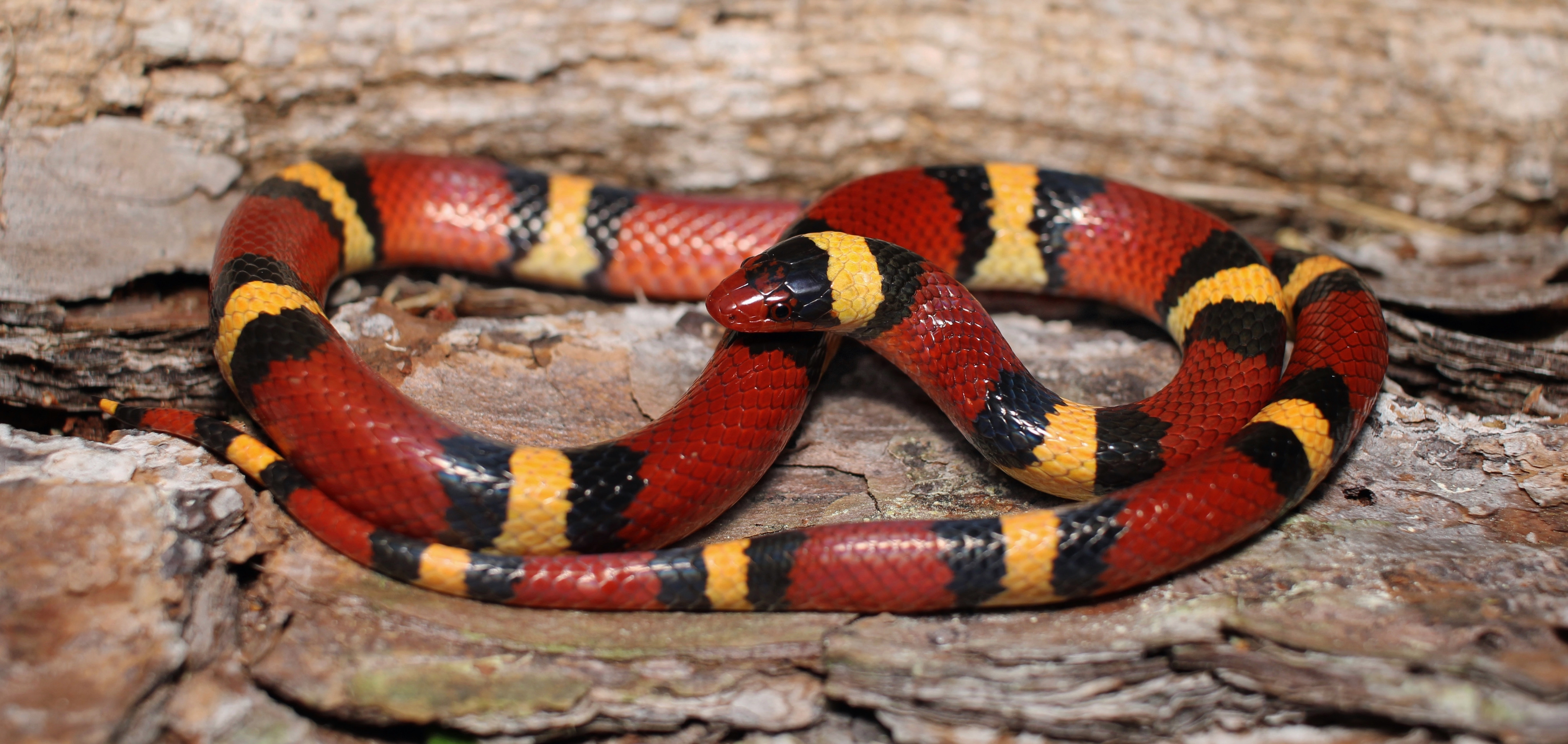

Coachwhip (Masticophis flagellum). Long and thin. Color is brown to black, often with the head and upper body darker than the rest.

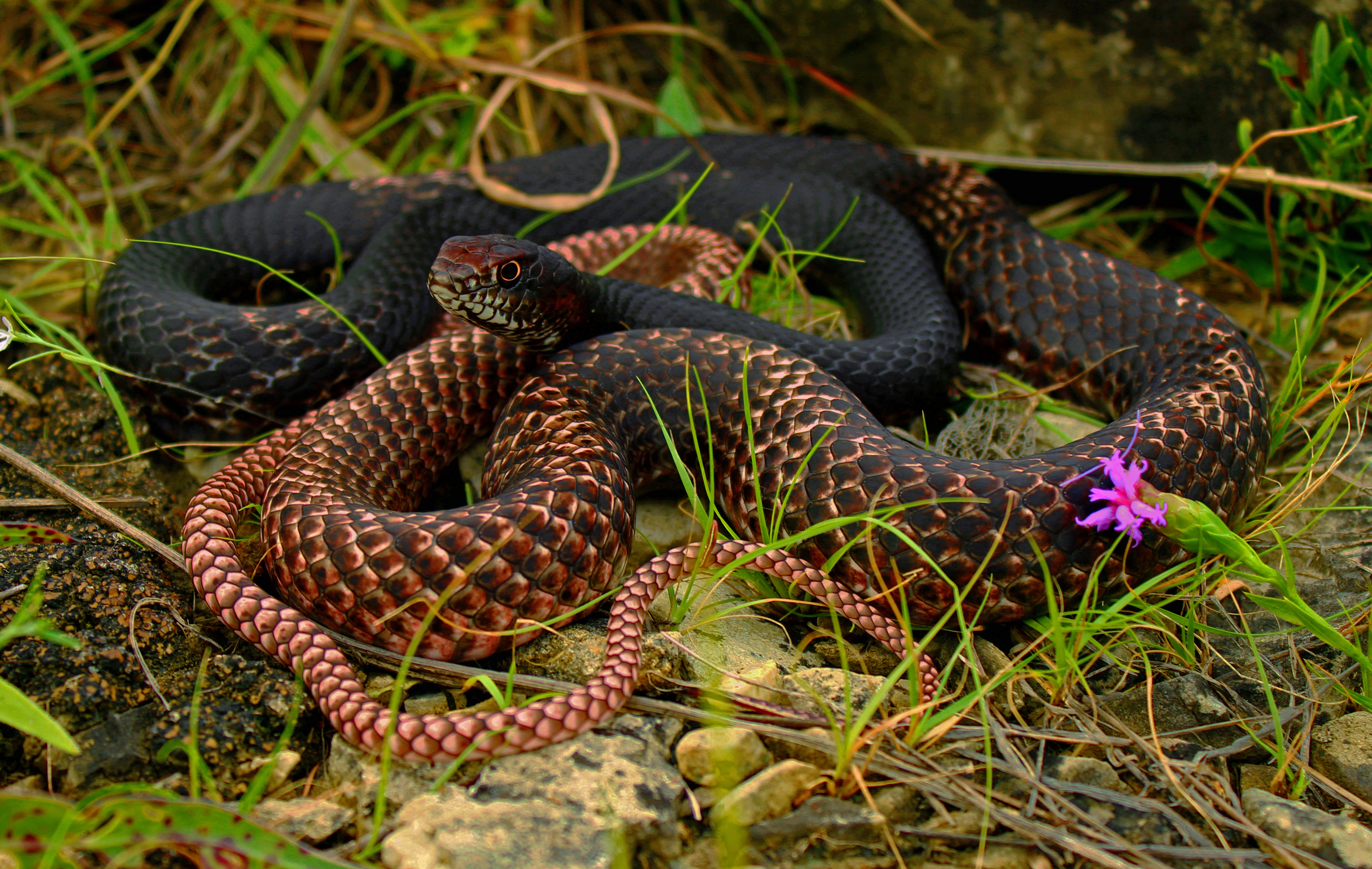

Plain-bellied water snake (Nerodia erythrogaster). Aquatic. Adults have gray-brown dorsal surface, with bright red to yellow belly. Juveniles are patterns with a series of mostly disconnected bands. Labial (lip) scales have vertical stripes.

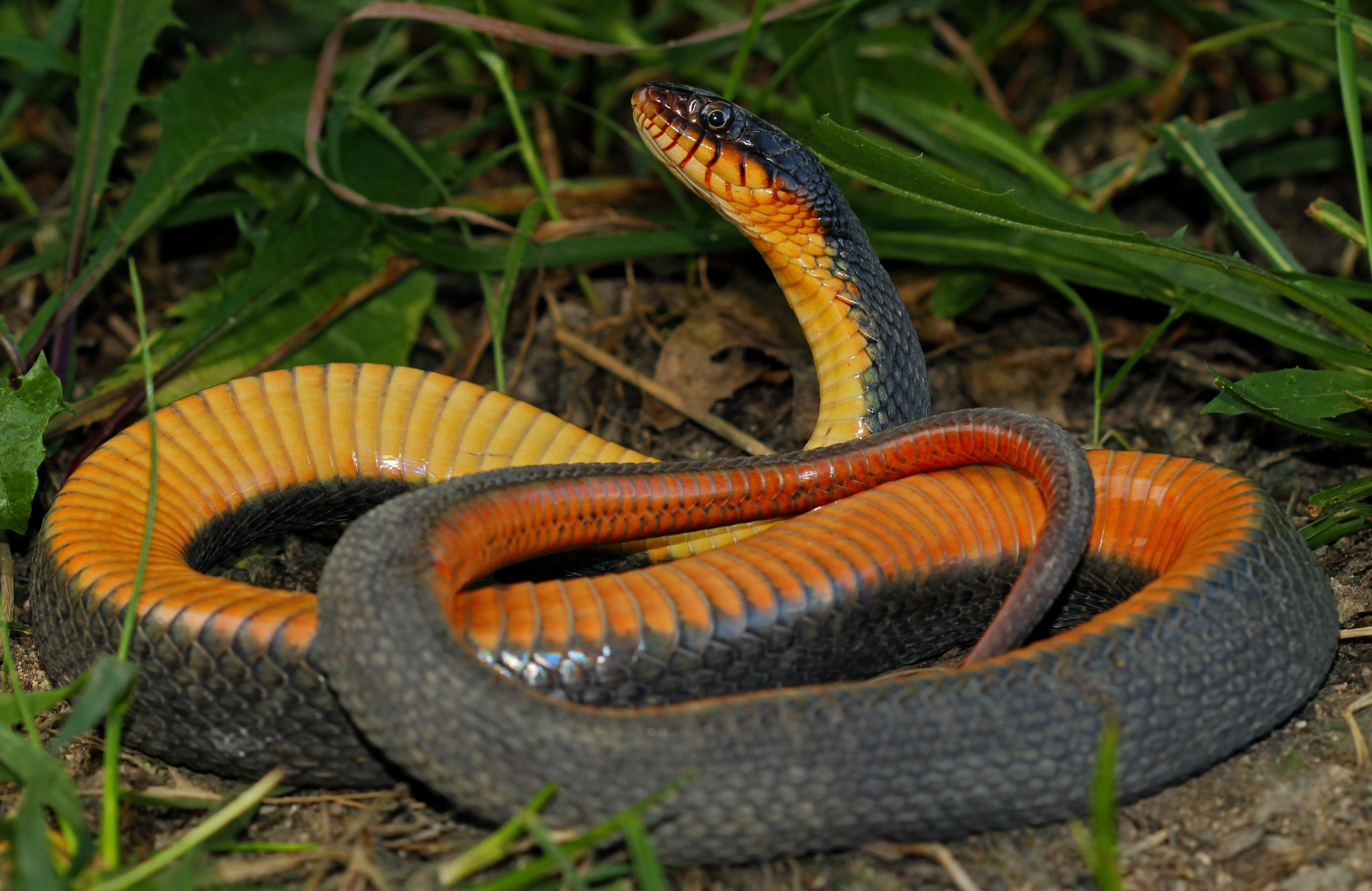

Banded water snake (Nerodia fasciata). Aquatic. Brown to bluish gray coloration, with area between bands lighter. Pattern is a series of continuous bands, wider at the top. Belly is blotched or striped. Labial (lip) scales have vertical stripes.

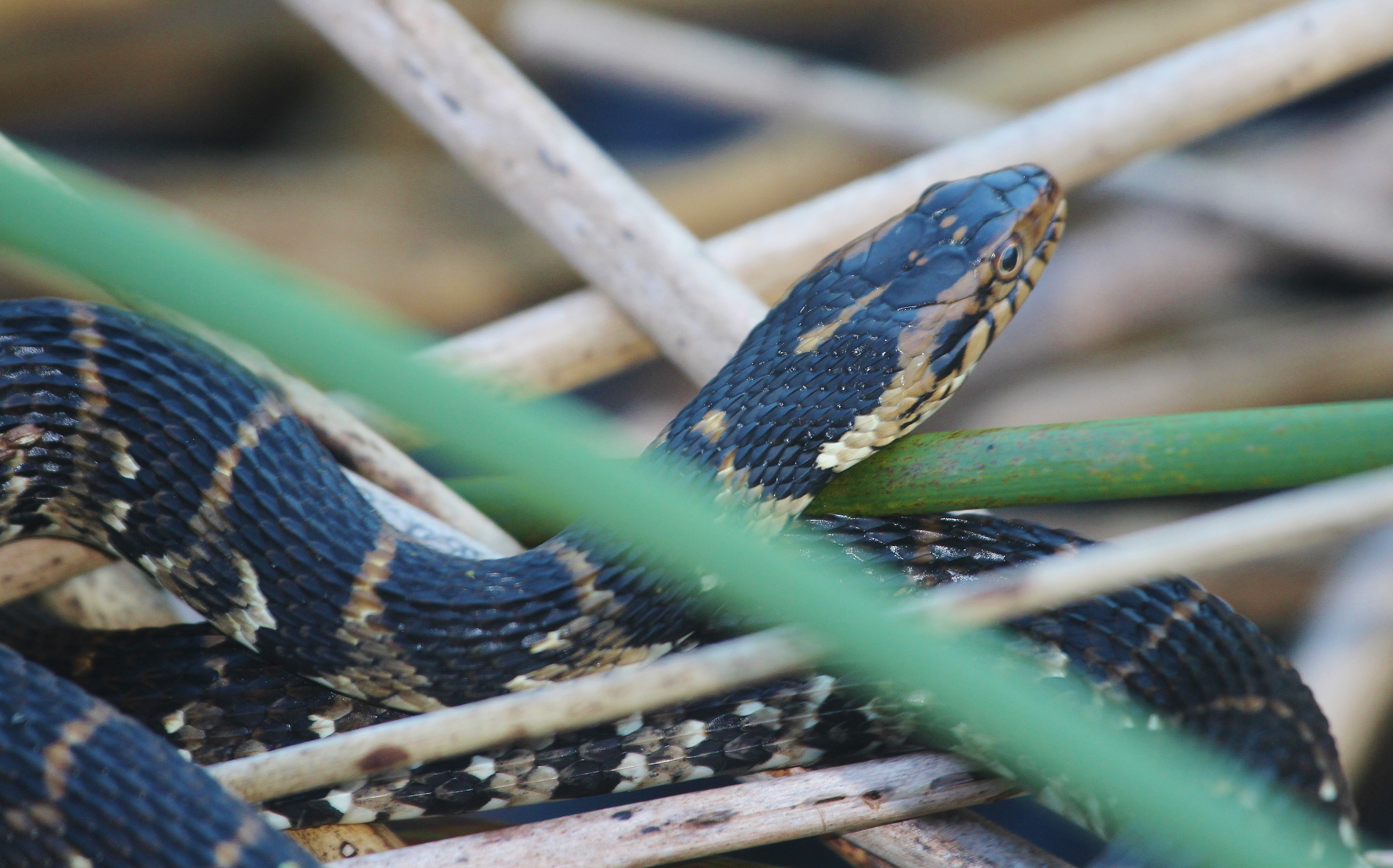

Florida green water snake (Nerodia floridana). Aquatic. Greenish-brown with vertical barring down the body.

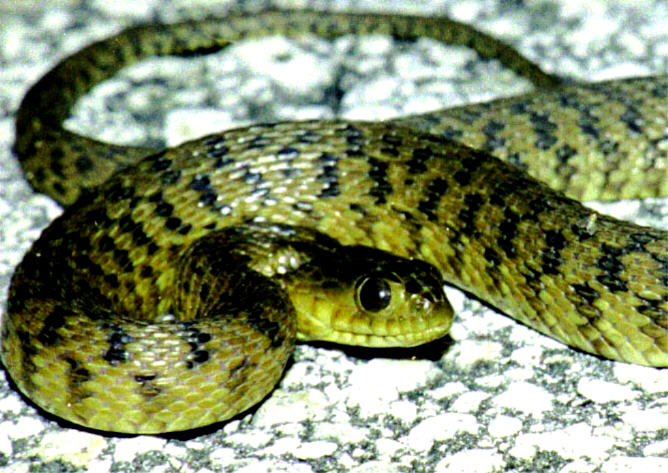

Northern water snake (Nerodia sipedon). Aquatic. Similar to banded water snake, with light brown-gray background and series of darker gray bands. Bands are wider at the top. Bands become increasingly disconnected, similar to young plain-bellied water snakes. Belly is blotched or striped. Labial (lip) scales have vertical stripes.

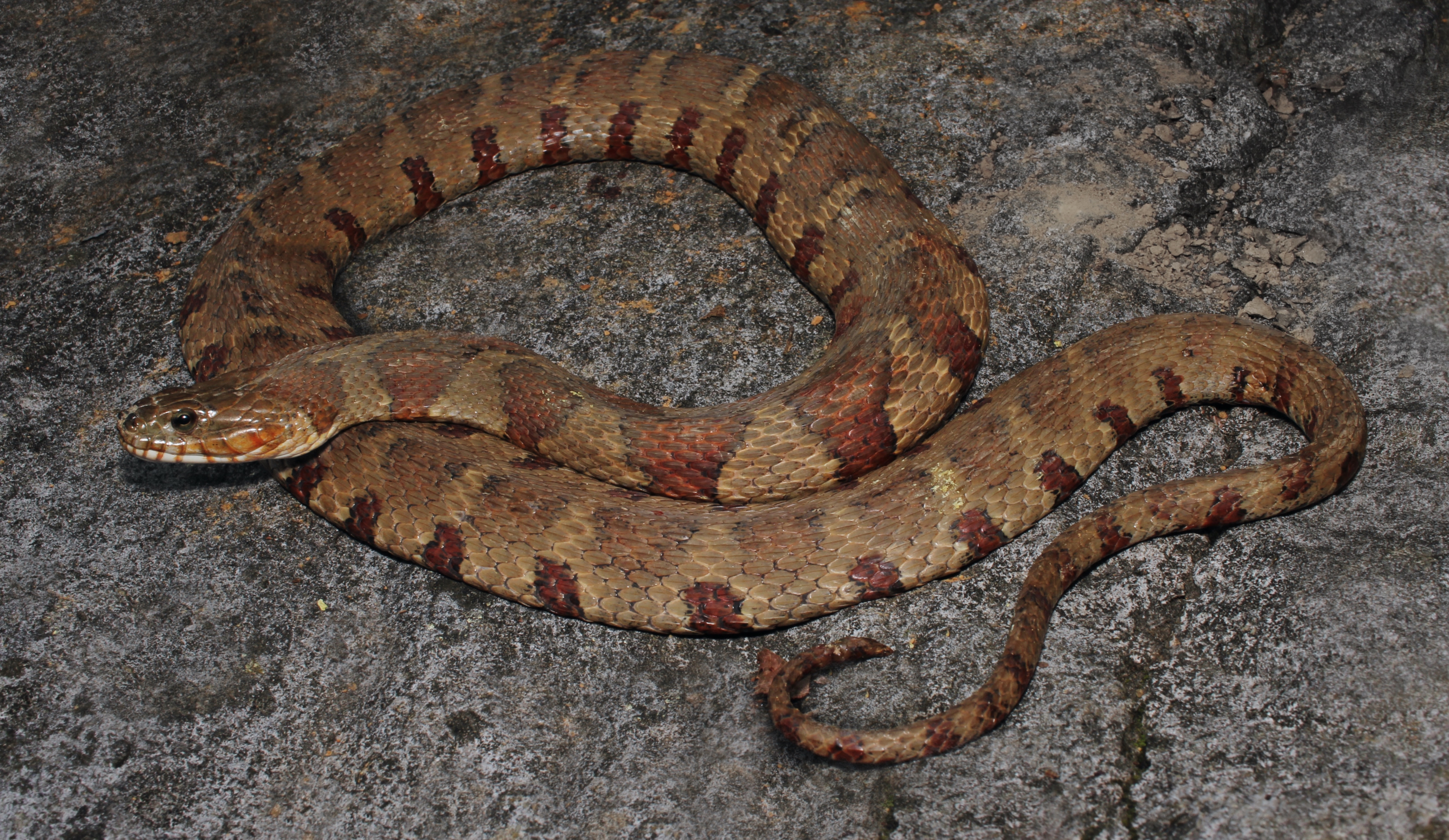

Brown water snake (Nerodia taxispilota). Aquatic. Brown throughout. Pattern includes dark square dorsal blotches, offset and disconnected to equally-sized side blotches.

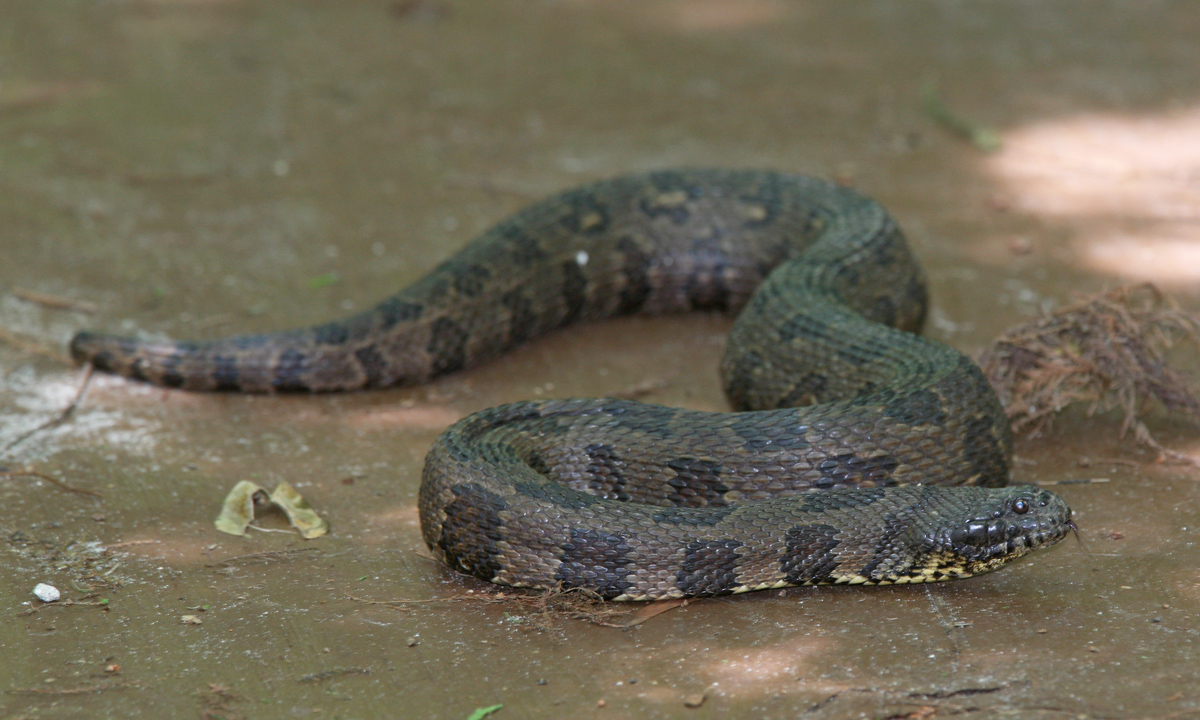

Rough green snake (Opheodrys aestivus). Entirely bright green with keeled scales.

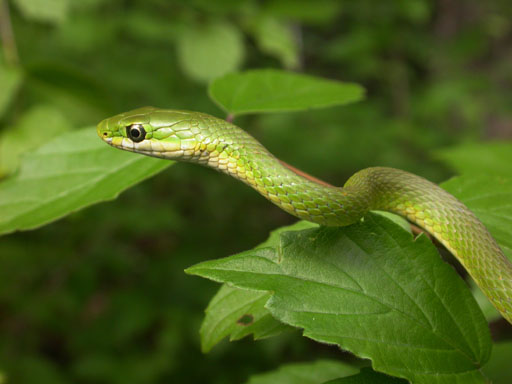

Pine snake (Pituophis melanoleucus). Large snake with blurred pattern of dorsal and lateral blotches. Various shades of tan, brown, and black.

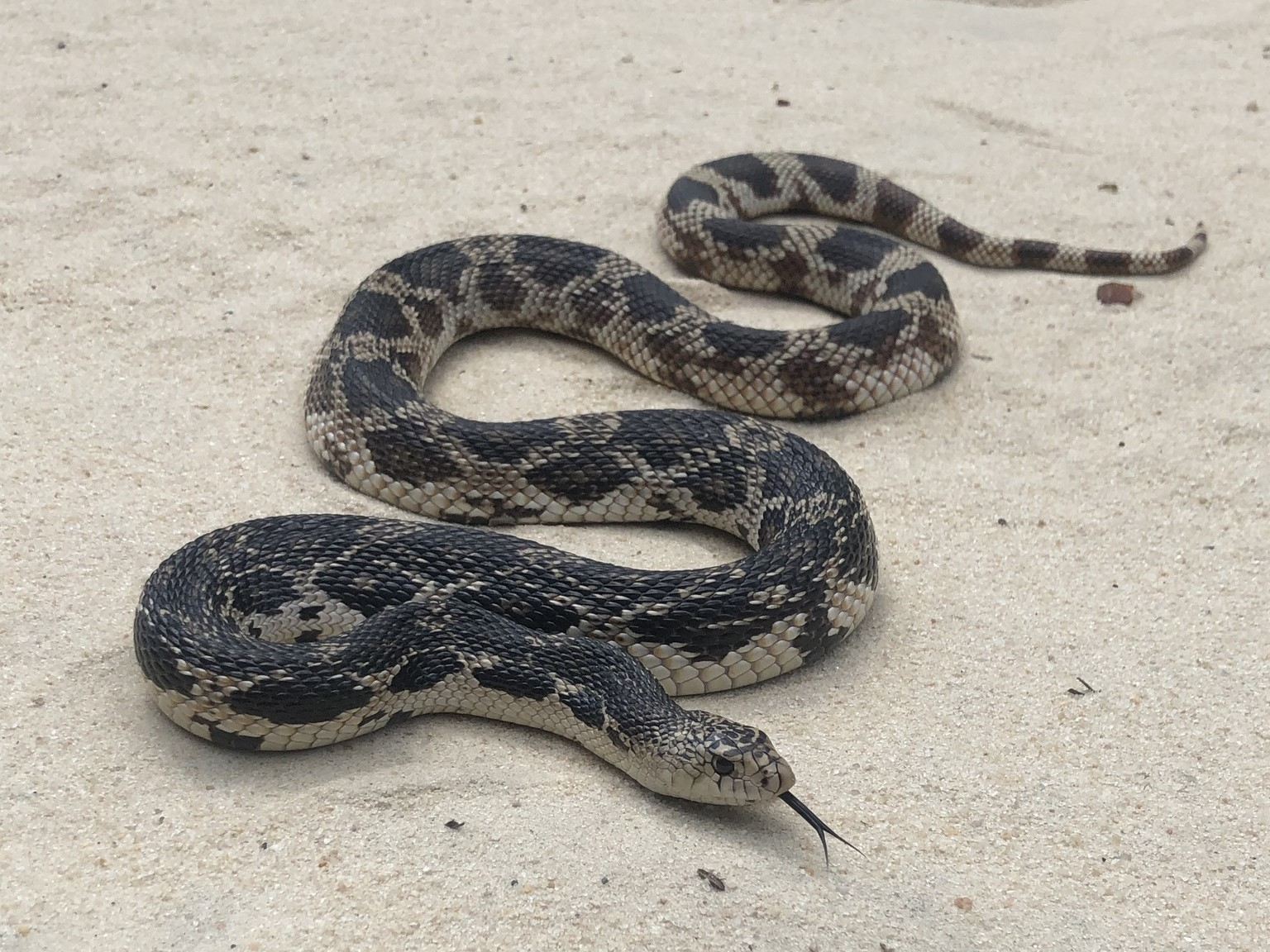

Striped crayfish snake (Liodytes alleni). Small aquatic snake. Mostly dark-brown to black. Belly is yellow, with a line of black dots. Light upper labial (lip) scales.

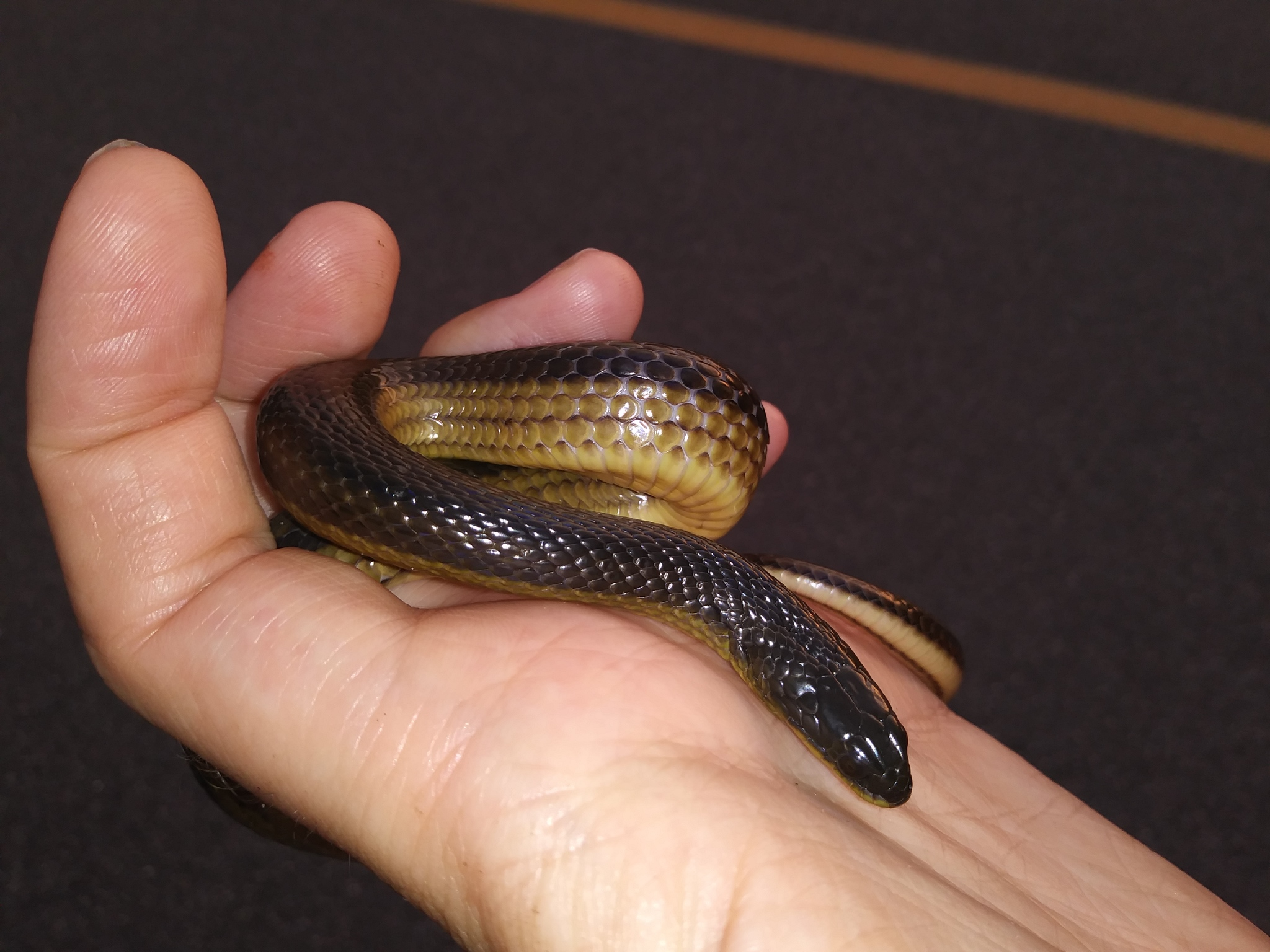

Glossy crayfish snake (Liodytes rigida). Small aquatic snake. Mostly dark brown, with a yellow belly. Belly has two lines of black dots. Light upper labial (lip) scales.

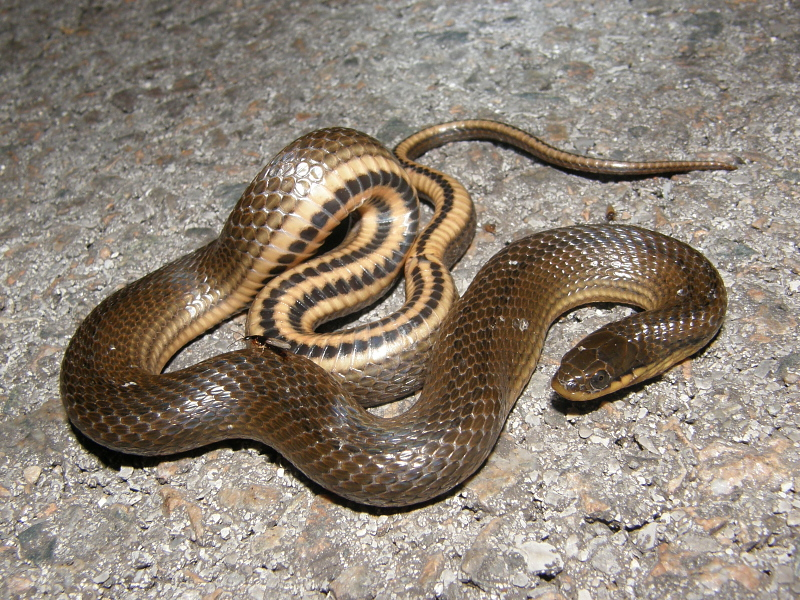

Black swamp snake (Liodytes pygaea). Small aquatic snake. Black with plain bright red belly. Dark upper labial (lip) scales.

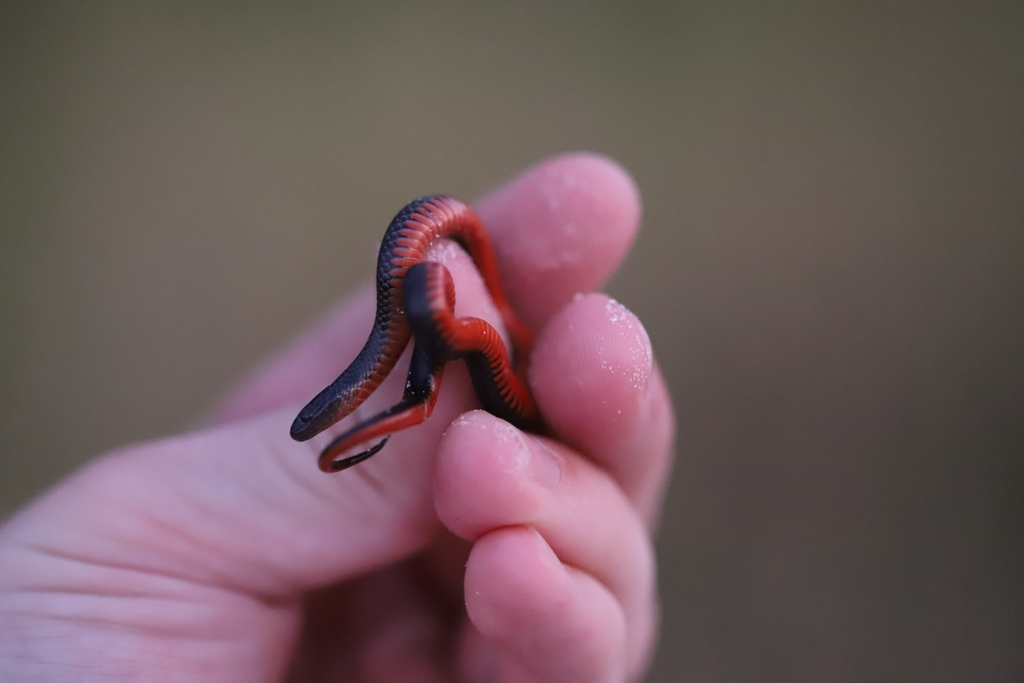

Queen snake (Regina septemvittata). Dark gray with variable number of black longitudinal stripes, usually two on the edge belly scales, followed by light stripes on scale rows 1 and 2. Light labial scales. Belly sometimes has additional two dark stripes.

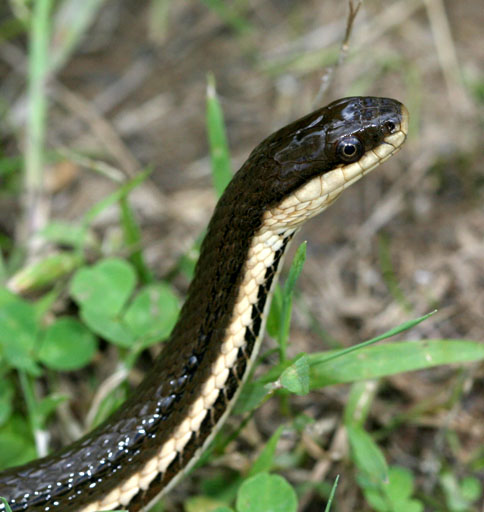

Pine woods snake (Rhadinaea flavilata). Small and brownish-orange. Darker head with light labial scales and mask-like stripes through eyes, rimmed in white.

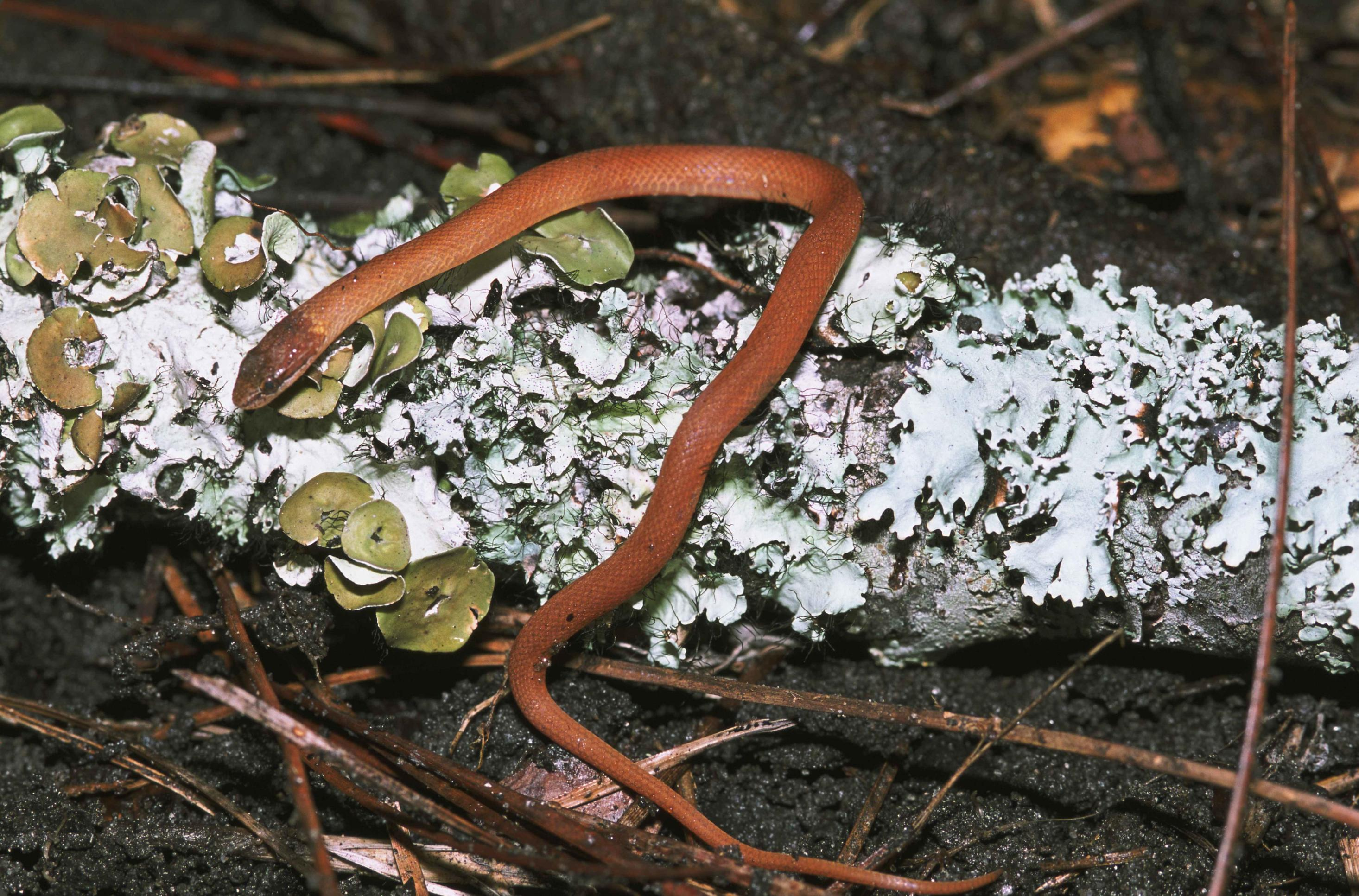

Dekay's brown snake (Storeria dekayi). Small. Brown to gray, with parallel lines of dots down the dorsum. Dots sometimes merge into stripes or crossbands. Black mark behind the head and under eye. Juveniles have light collar.

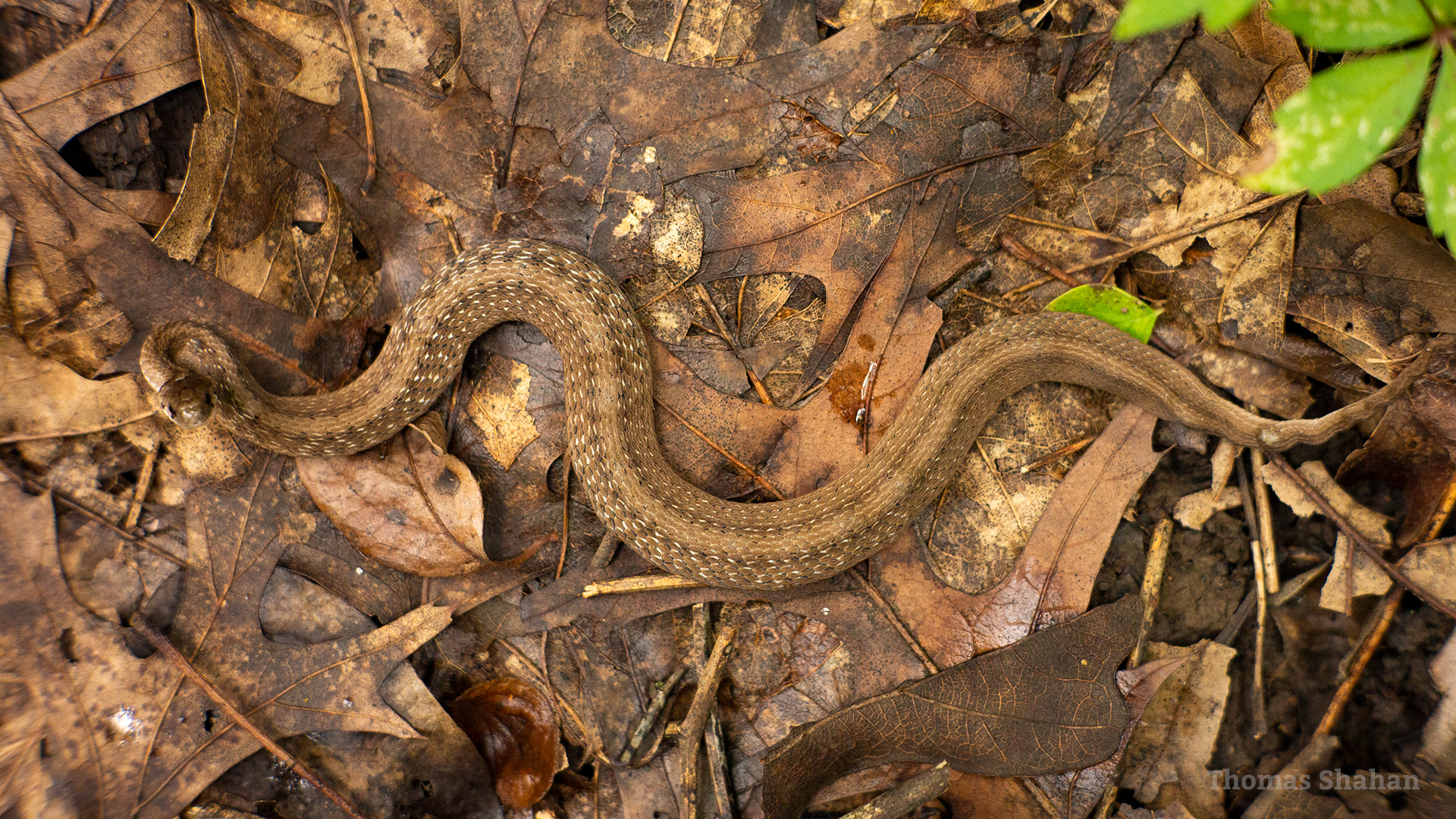

Red-bellied snake (Storeria occipitomaculata). Small. Dorsal color ranges from fawn to black. Often has parallel stripes down the back. Often has light collar, sometimes made up of a few light spots, even as an adult. Belly is bright red to orange.

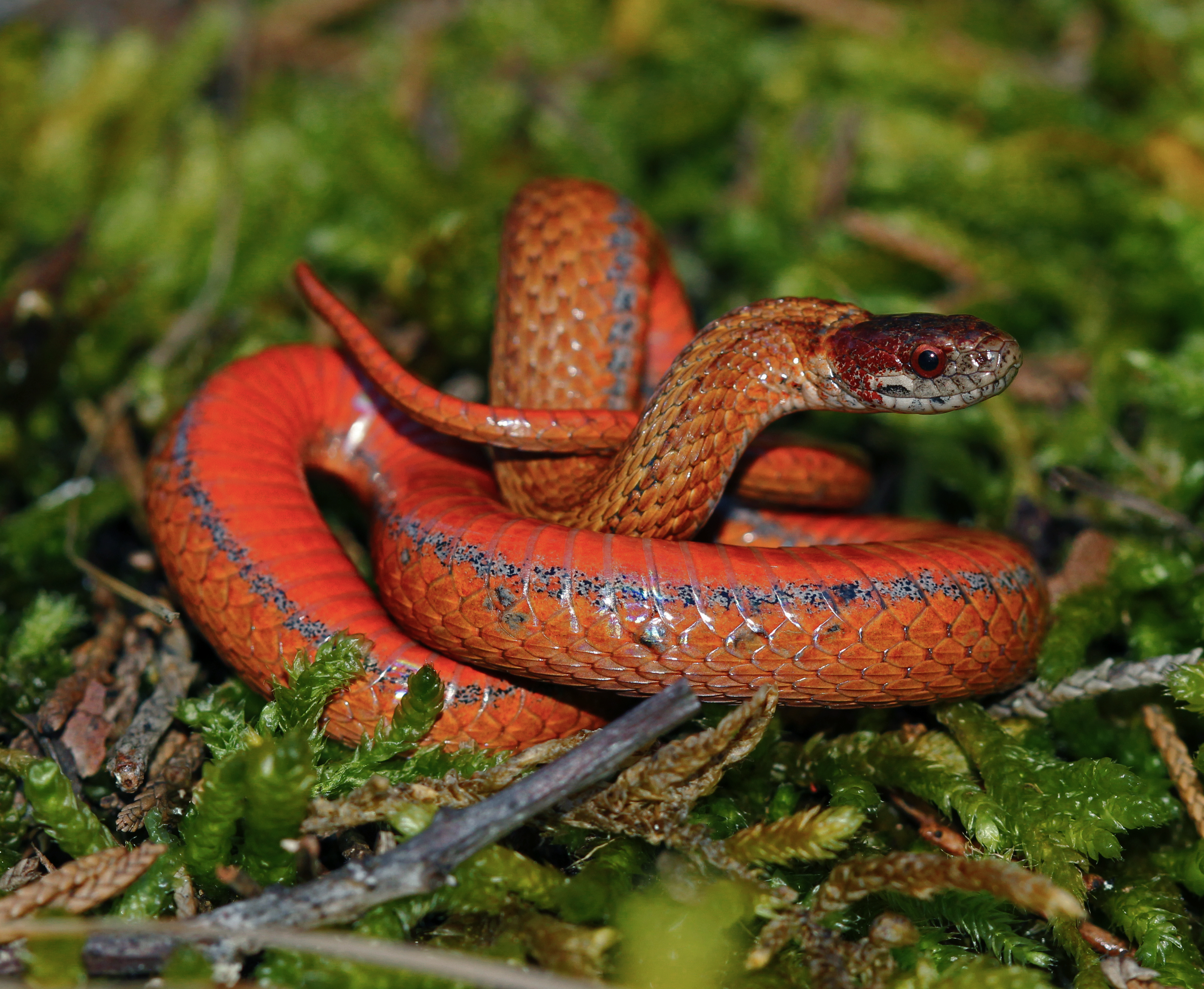

Florida brown snake (Storeria victa). Very similar to Dekay's brown snake. Light neck band even when mature. Found only near Florida border.

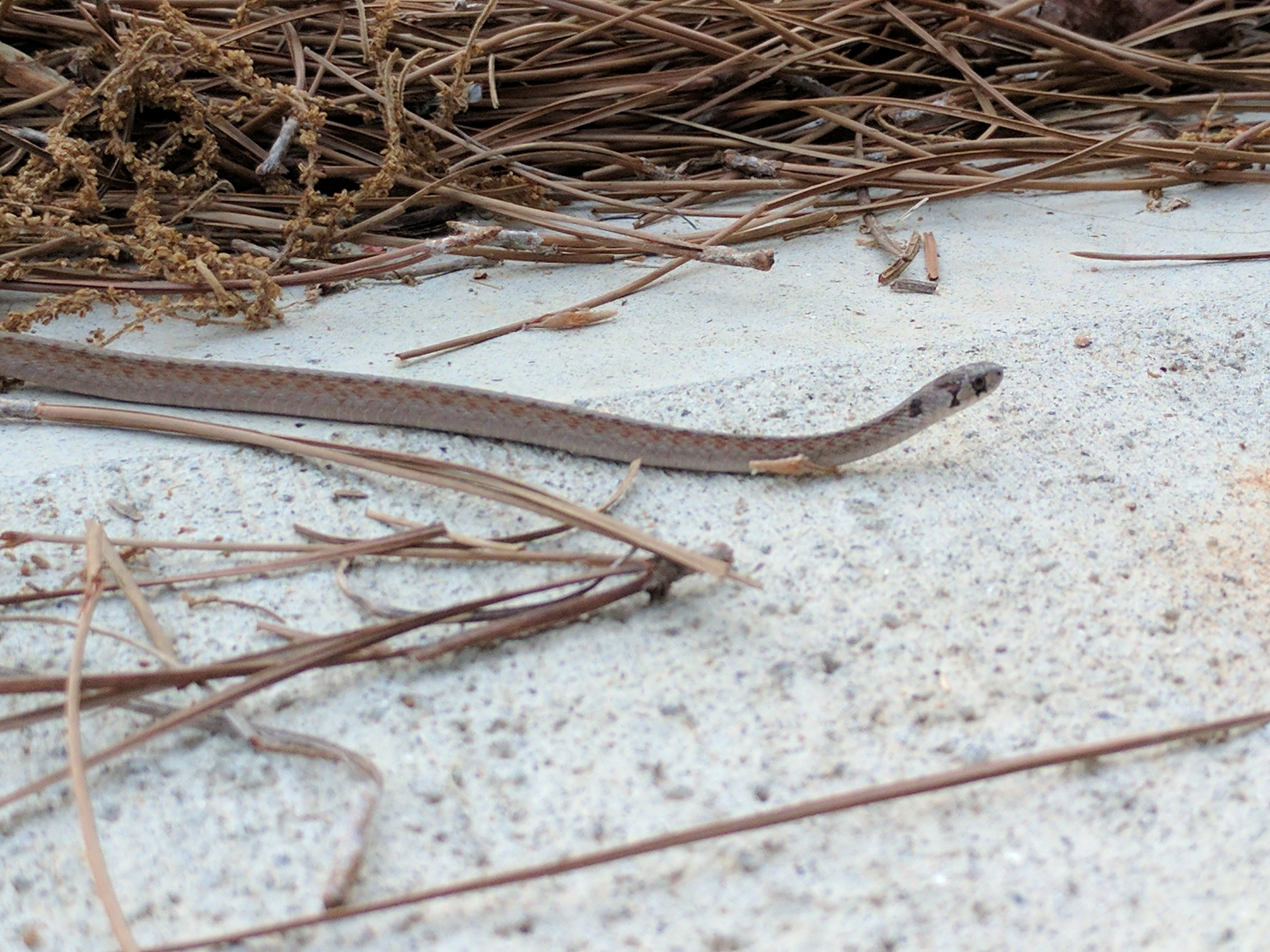

Southeastern crowned snake (Tantilla coronata). Small fossorial snake. Tan with black collar, separated from flat dark head by unbroken light collar.

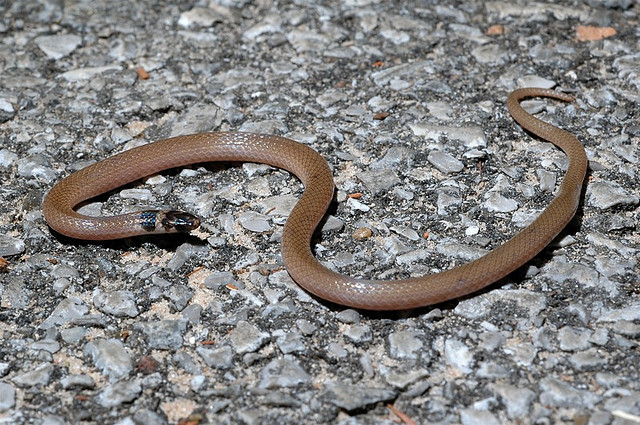

Central Florida crowned snake (Tantilla relicta). Small fossorial snake. Very similar to southeastern crowned snake, but light collar is incomplete.

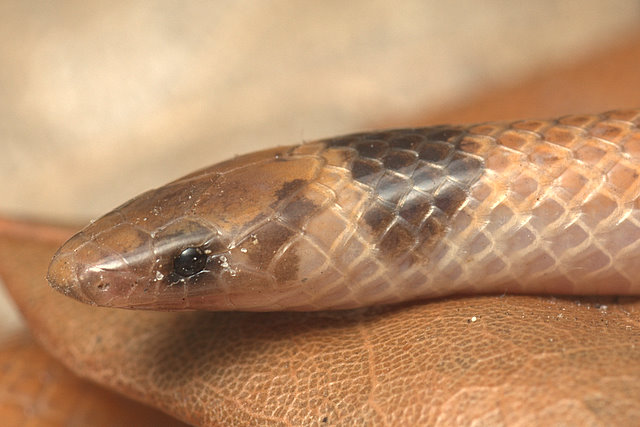

Eastern ribbon snake (Thamnophis saurita). Thin, aquatic snake. Three light longitudinal stripes, one dorsal, and two on each side on scale rows three and four.

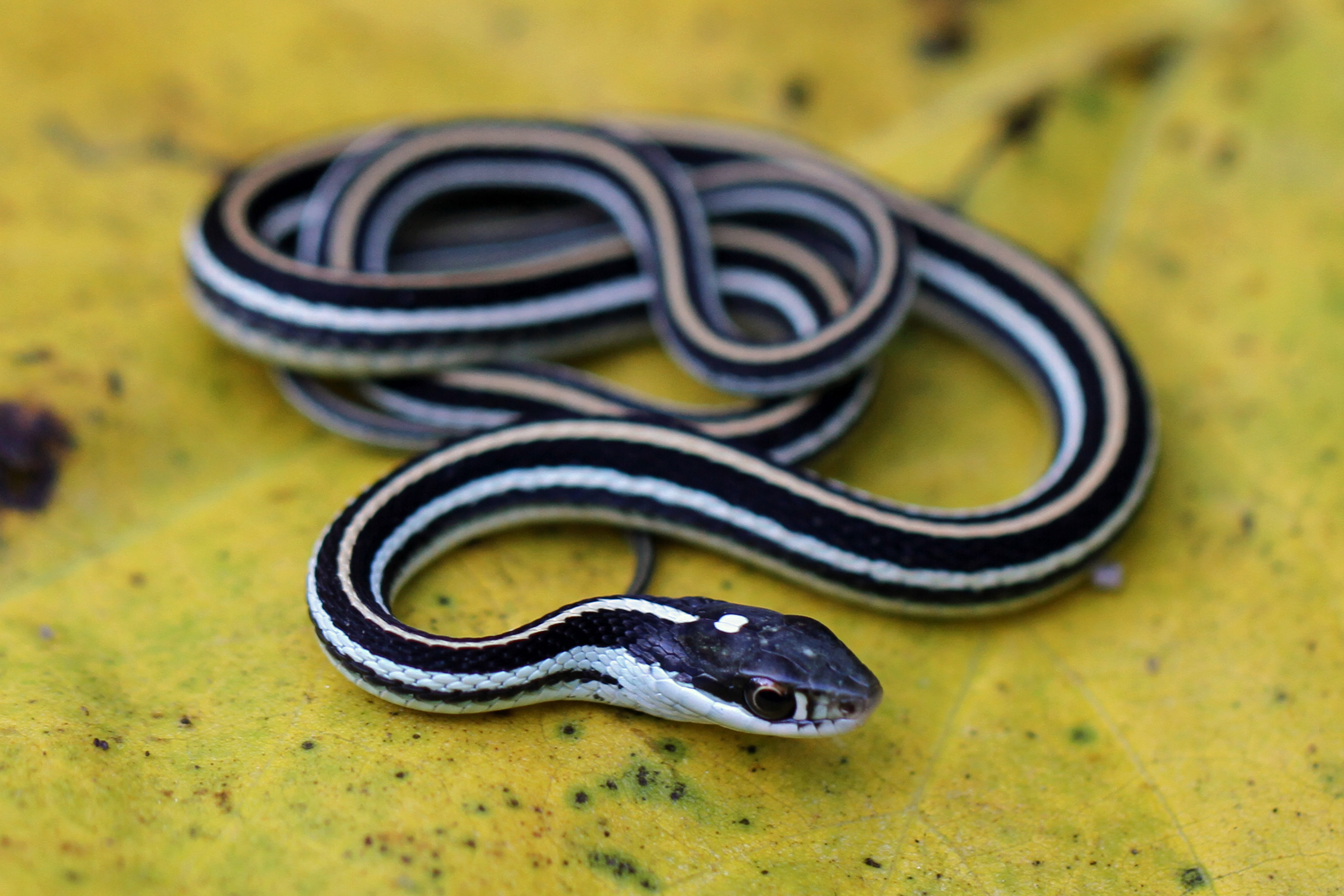

Eastern garter snake (Thamnophis sirtalis). Three light longitudinal stripes, one dorsal, and two on each side on scale rows two and three. Thicker-bodied than ribbonsnake. Sometimes with a checkered pattern between stripes.

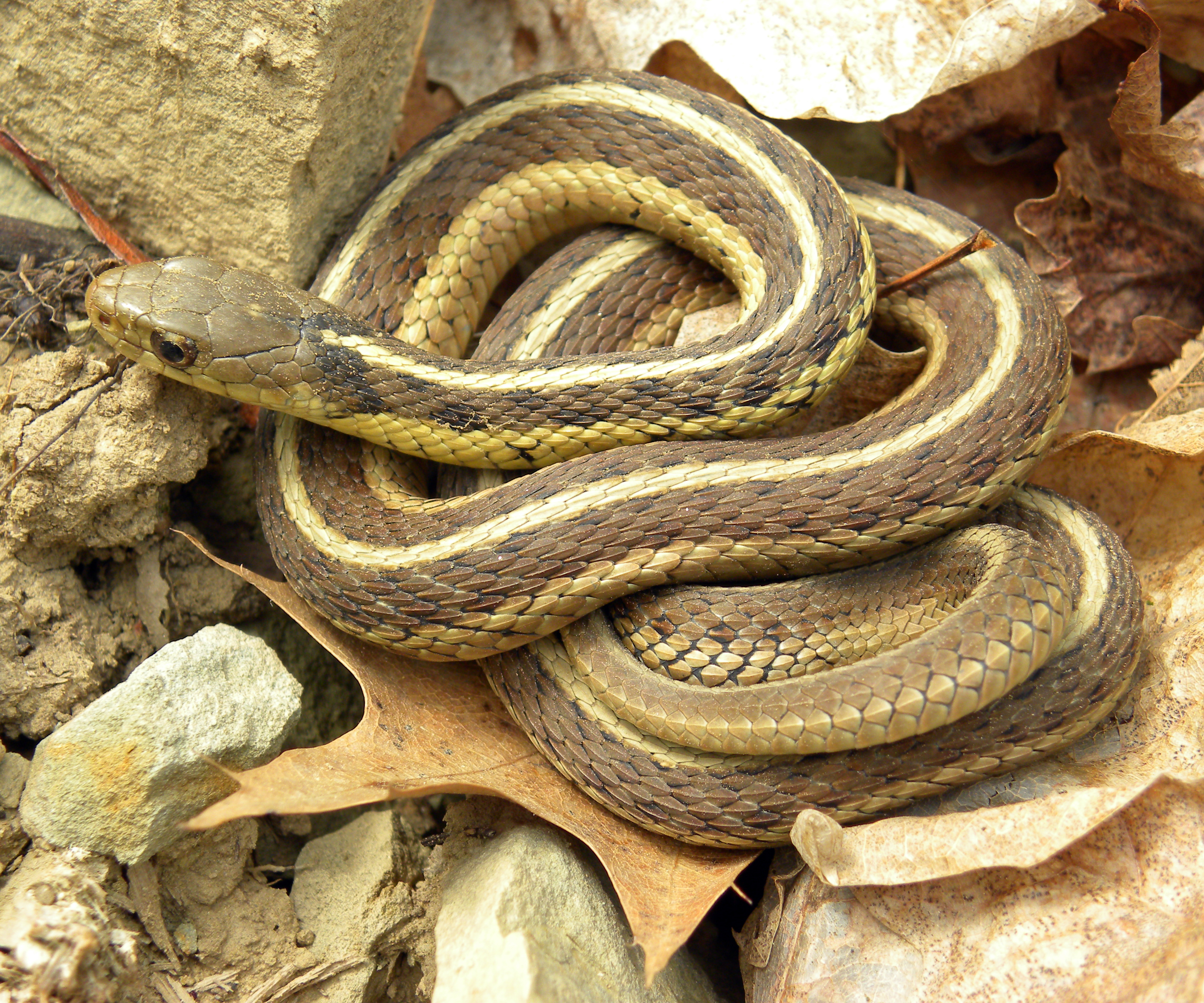

Rough earth snake (Virginia striatula). Small fossorial snake. Entirely brown with keeled scales. Juveniles have light collars.

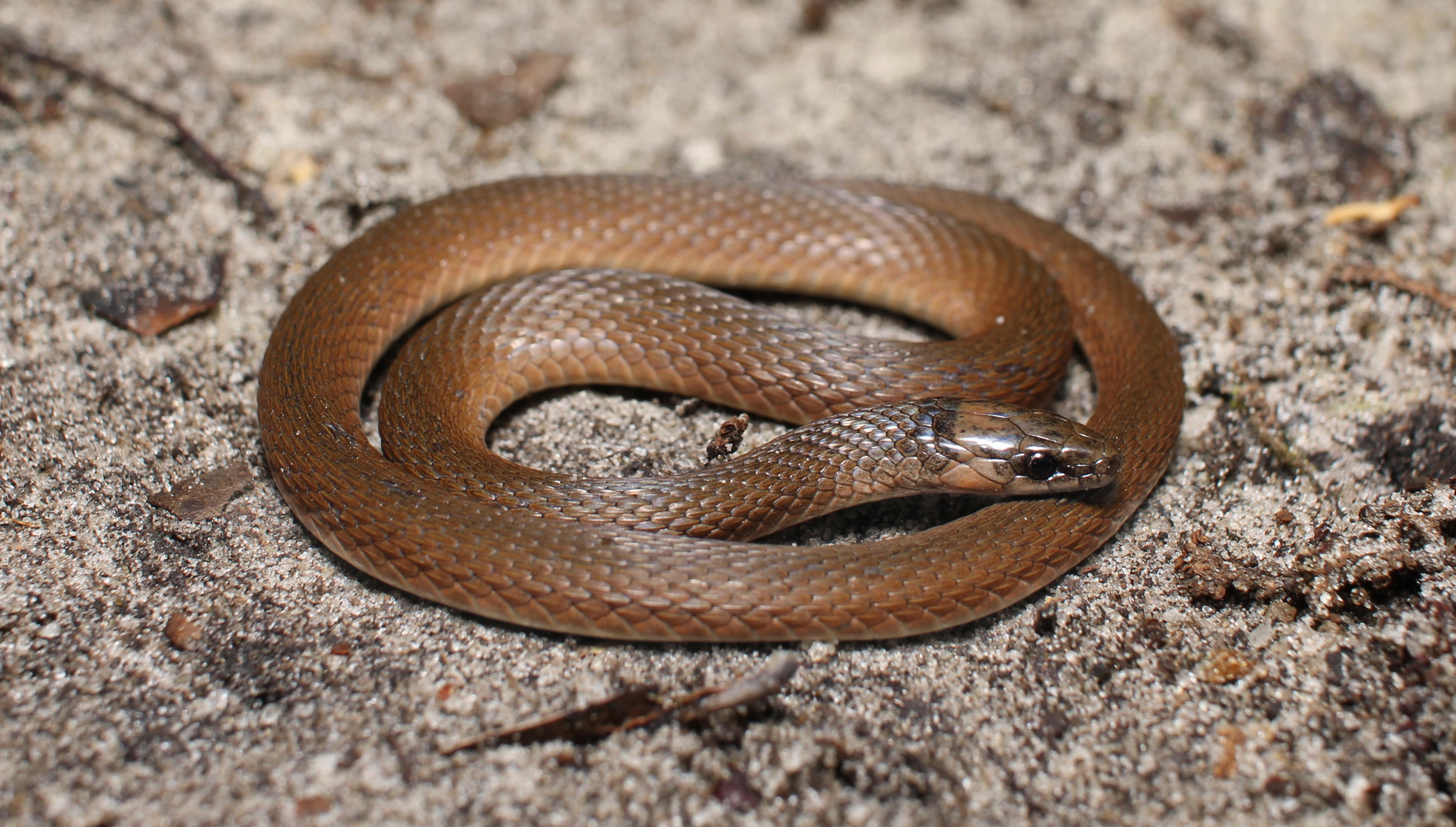

Smooth earth snake (Virginia valeriae). Small fossorial snake. Brown with smooth scales. Often has sparse black speckling.

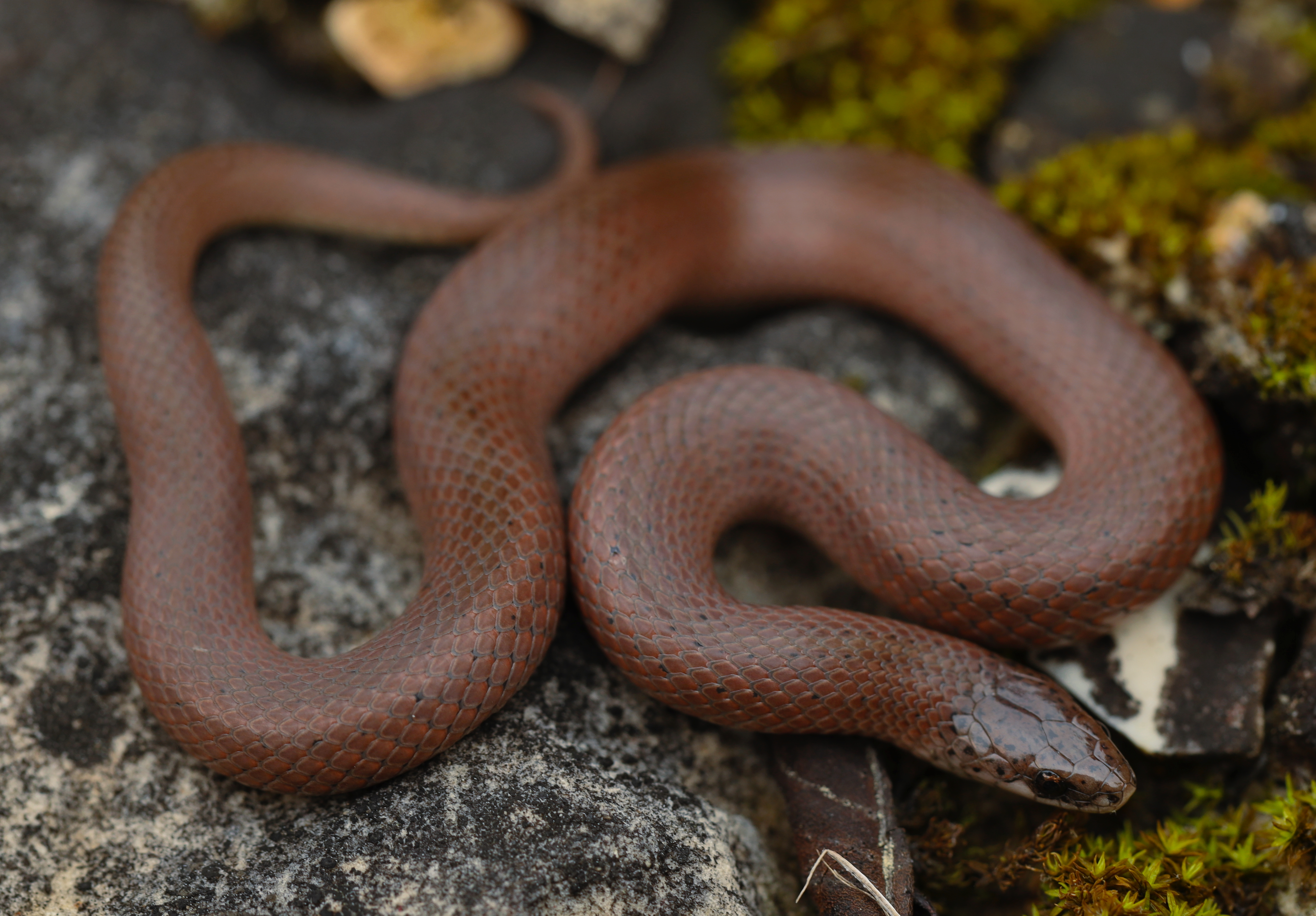

=== Venomous ===
Vipers

Copperhead (Agkistrodon contortrix). Thick-bodied. Tan with dark hourglass-like crossbands. Juveniles have bright yellow tails.

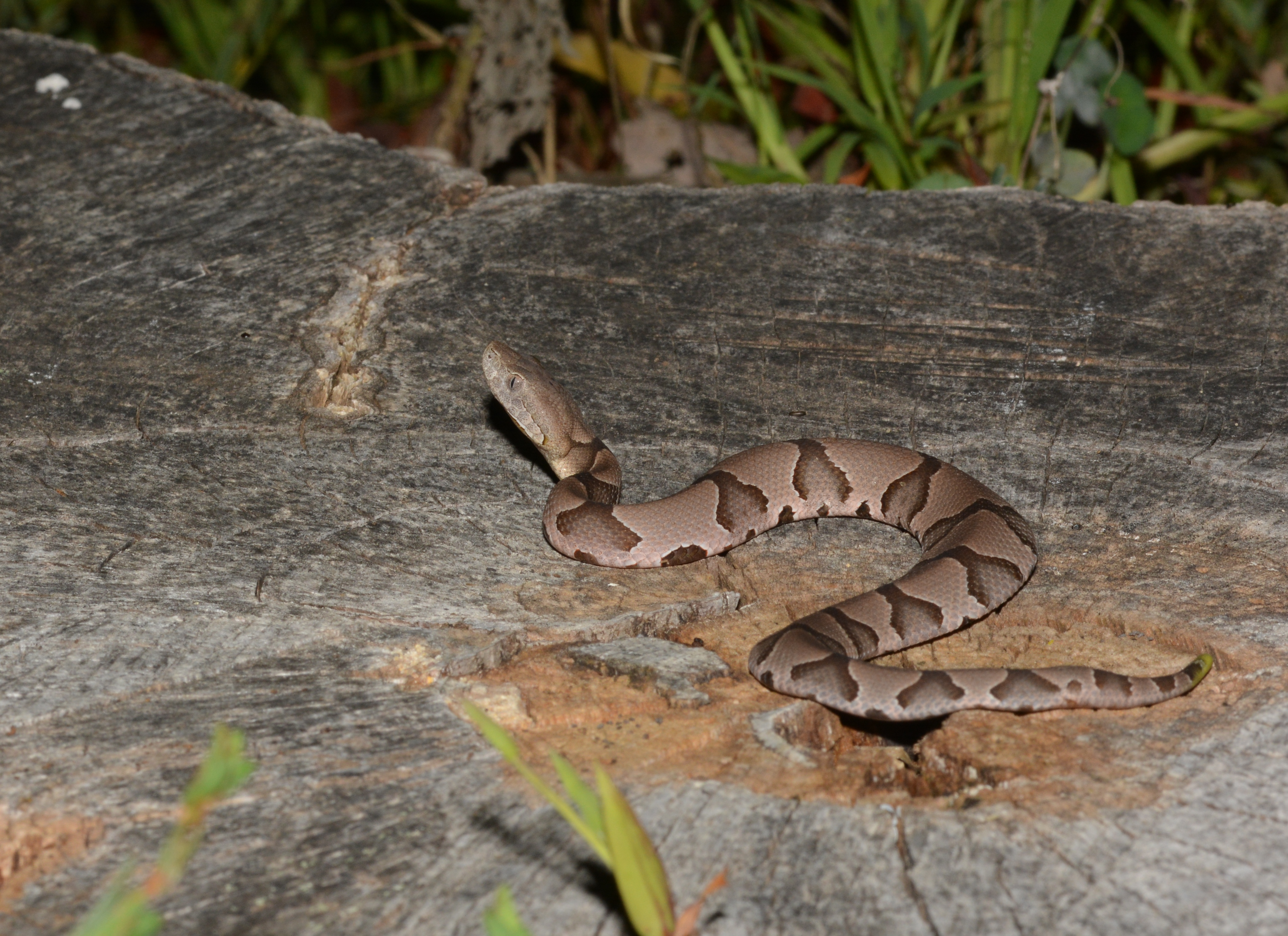

Cottonmouth (Water moccasin) (Agkistrodon piscivorus). Thick-bodied. Juveniles are similar to copperheads, with yellow tails and light-brown coloration. Markings are similar to copperheads but with more spots and other markings. Pattern fades into adulthood, becoming dark gray-brown. Exposes white mouth lining when threatened.

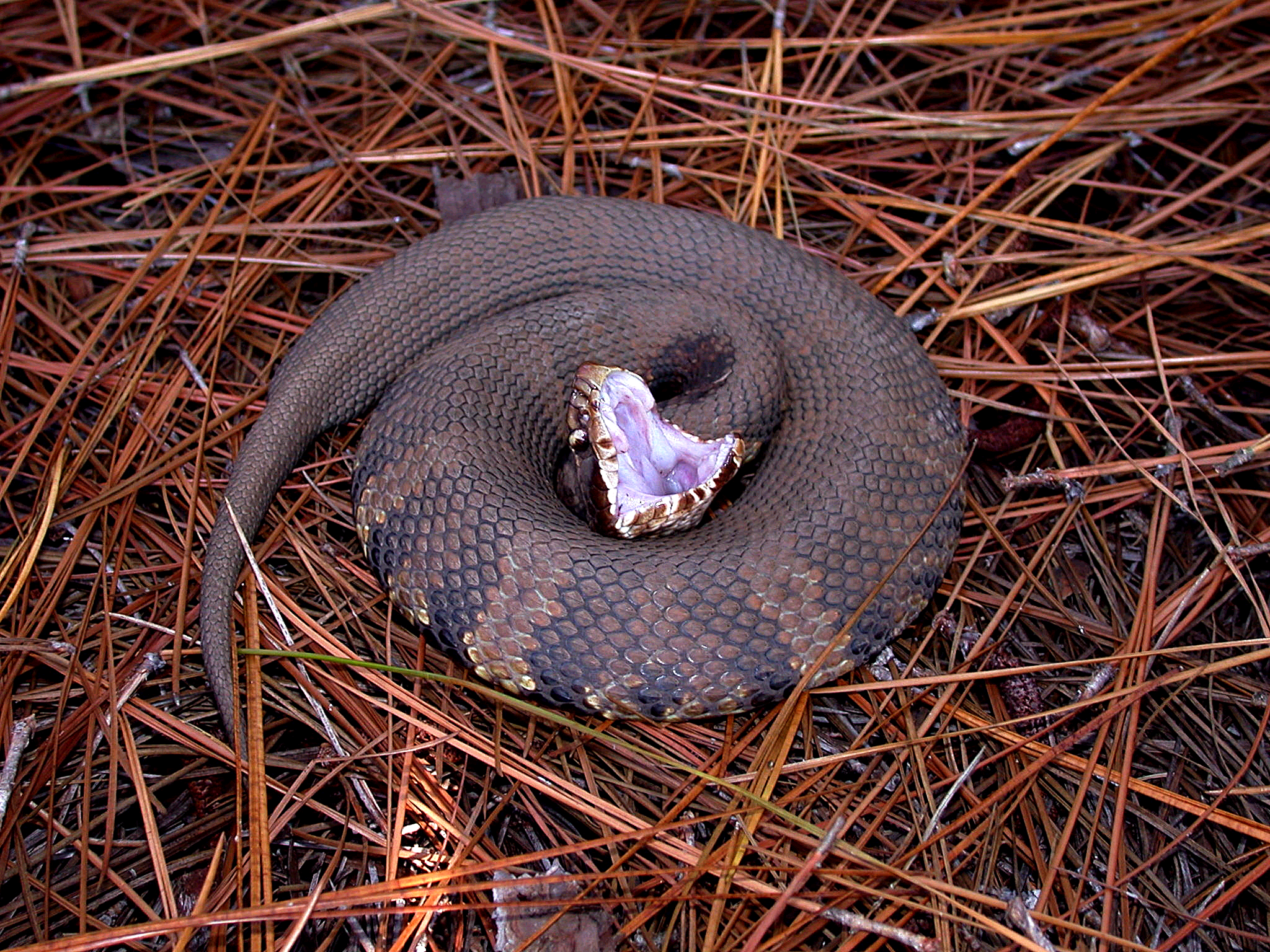

Eastern diamondback rattlesnake (Crotalus adamanteus). Large thick-bodied snake with rattle. Diamond-shaped dorsal blotches with white outlines. Head has mask pattern, with dark stripes intersecting the eyes, also outlined in white.

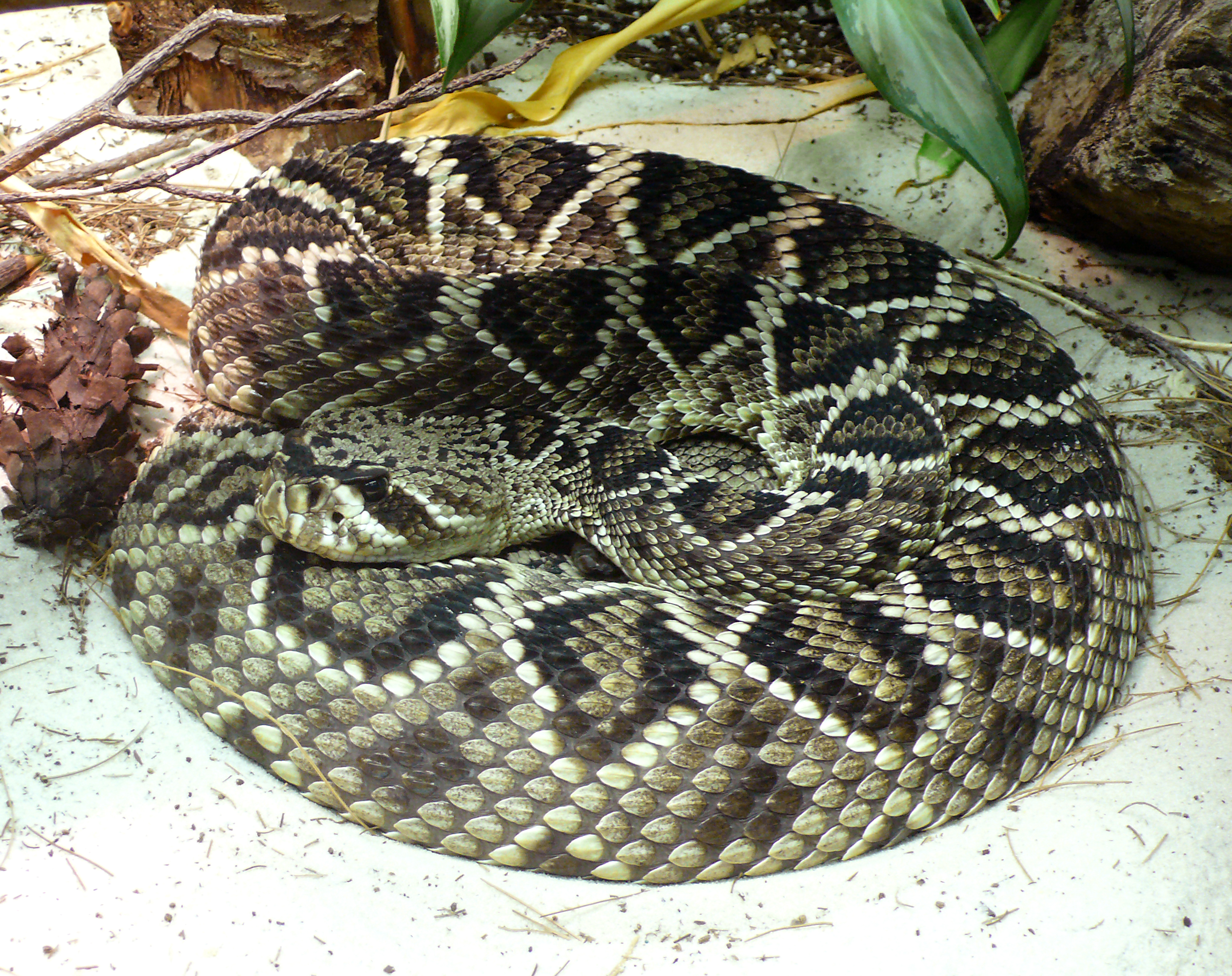

Timber rattlesnake (Crotalus horridus). Large thick-bodied snake with rattle. Most are brown with black chevron/zig-zag markings down the body. Melanism is common in some populations.

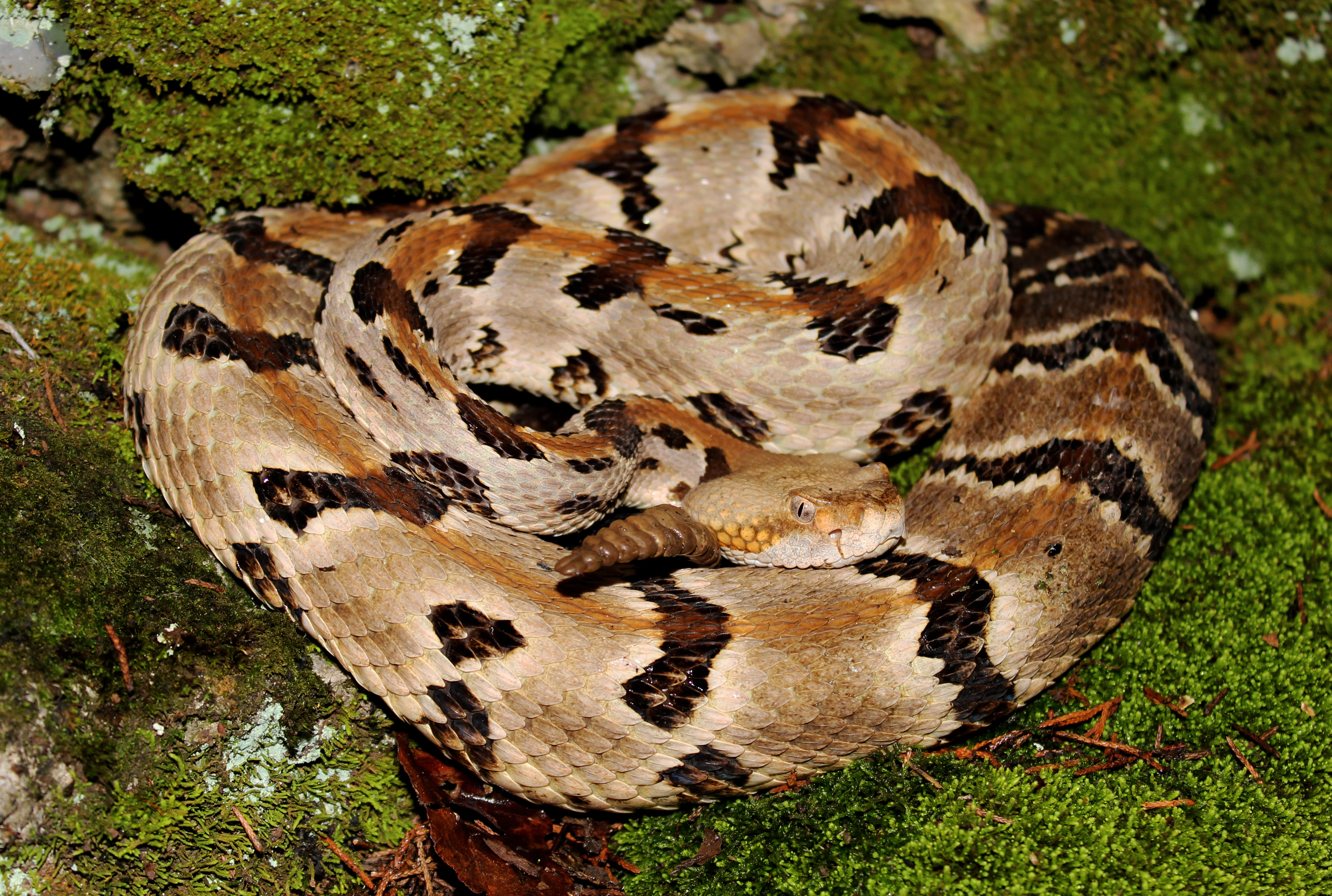

Pygmy rattlesnake (Sistrurus miliarius). Small snake with small rattle. Coloration is variable, but has dark dorsal blotches and head mask pattern.

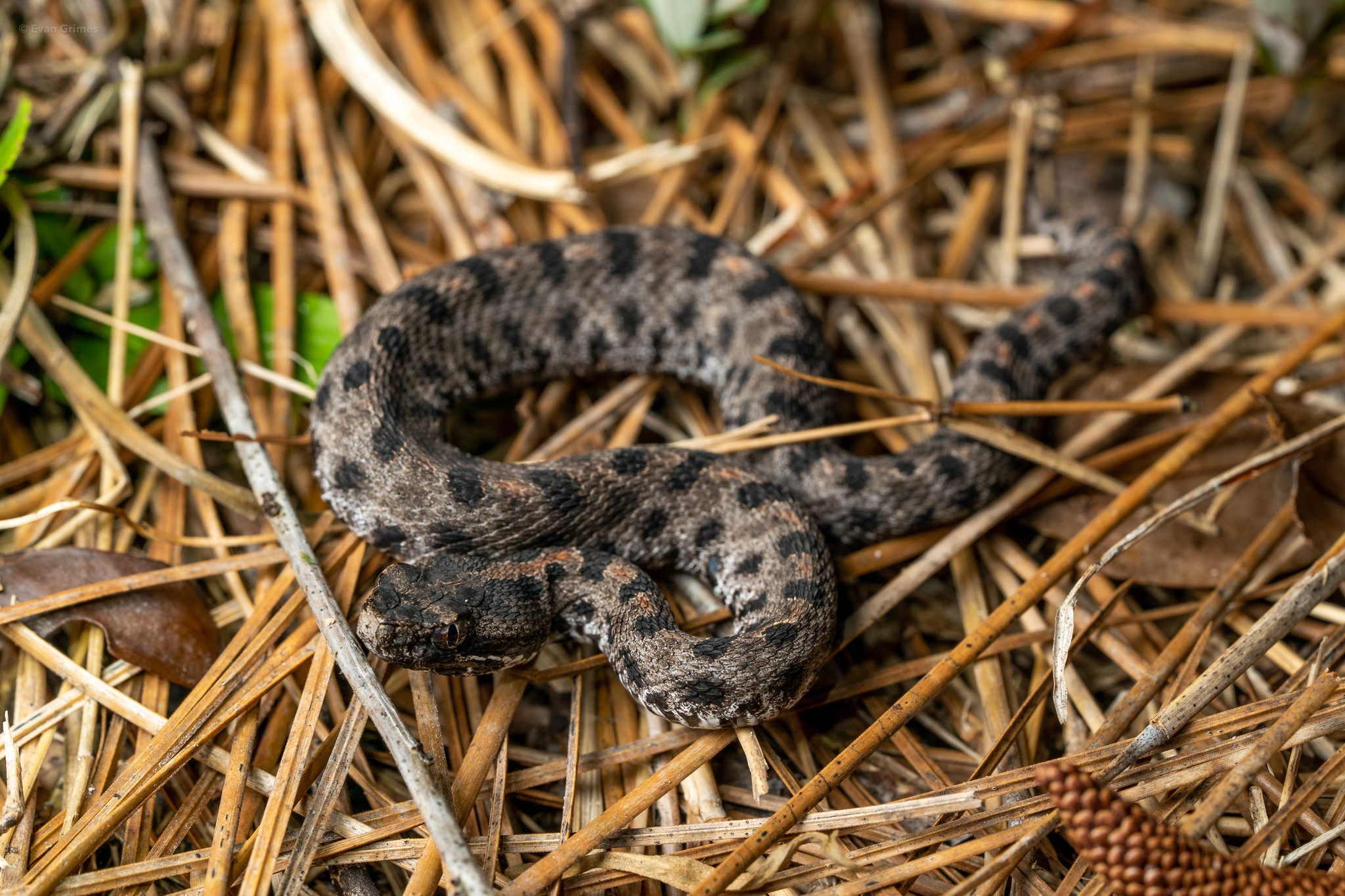

Coral snakes

Eastern coral snake (Micrurus fulvius). Alternating bands of red, yellow, and black, with the red and black bands being much wider than the yellow. Generally, the yellow separates and touches the red and black. However, the red color is not bright and can be confused with the black in poor lighting. Furthermore, various aberrant individuals exist that do not display the typical coloration. The nose tip is black.

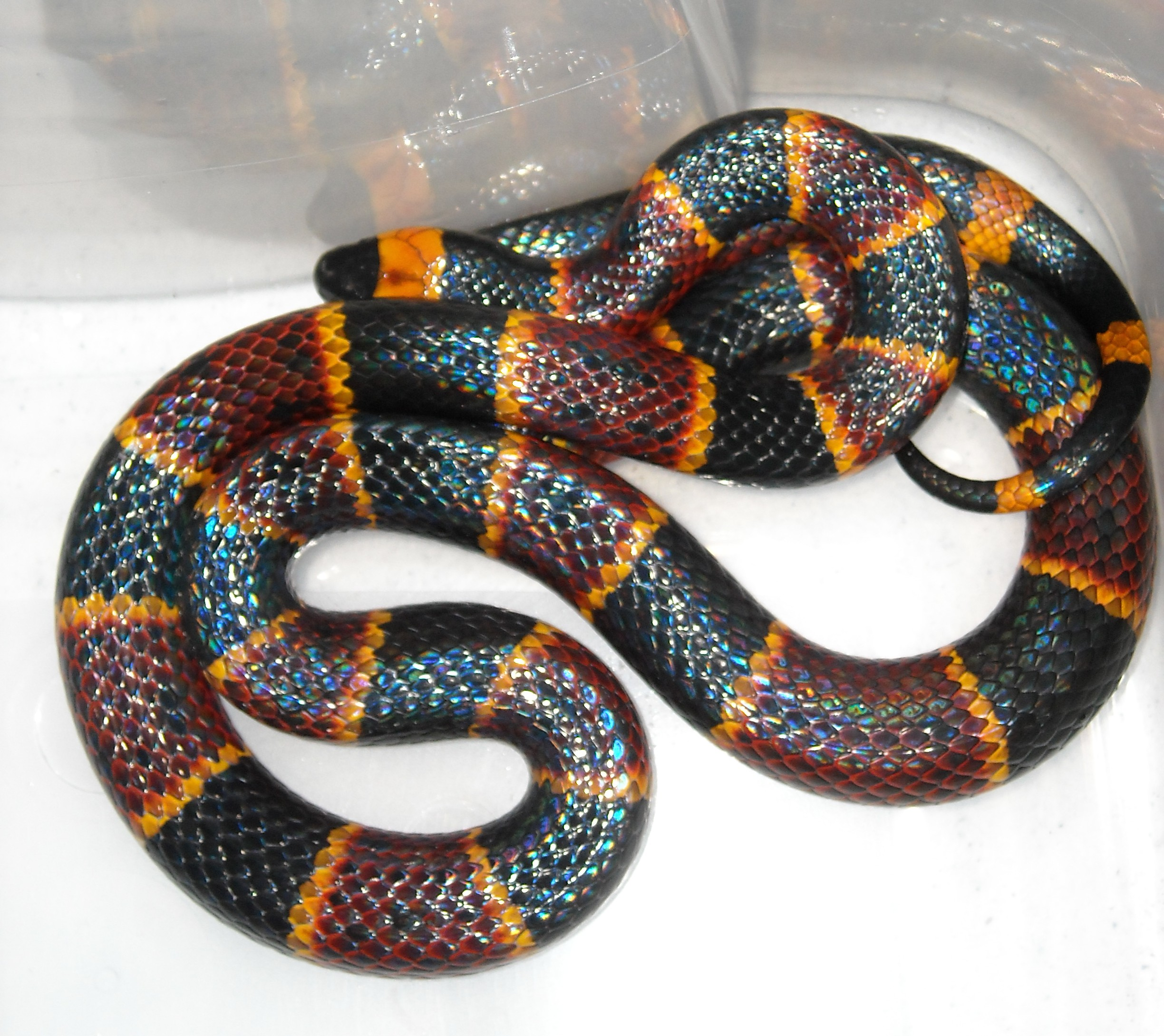
\
