= List of amphibians and reptiles of Saint Vincent =

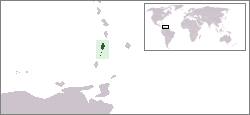
Location of Saint Vincent and the Grenadines in the Caribbean

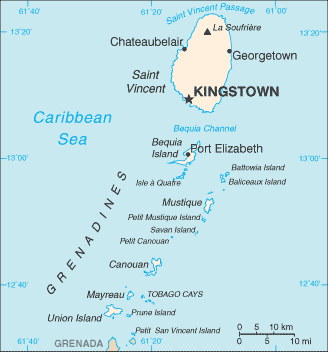
Saint Vincent lies to the north of the Grenadines island chain.

This is a list of amphibians and reptiles found on the island of Saint Vincent, located in the Caribbean Lesser Antilles. It is the main island of the nation Saint Vincent and the Grenadines.

== Amphibians ==
There are four species of amphibian on Saint Vincent, one of which was introduced. One species, Pristimantis shrevei, is endemic.

=== Frogs (Anura) ===
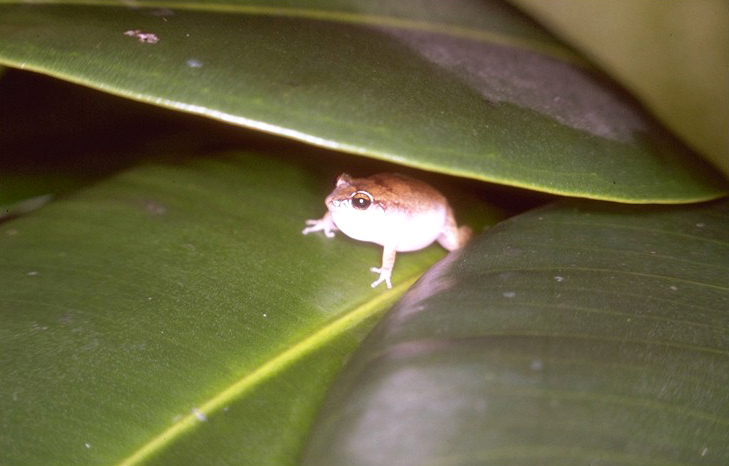
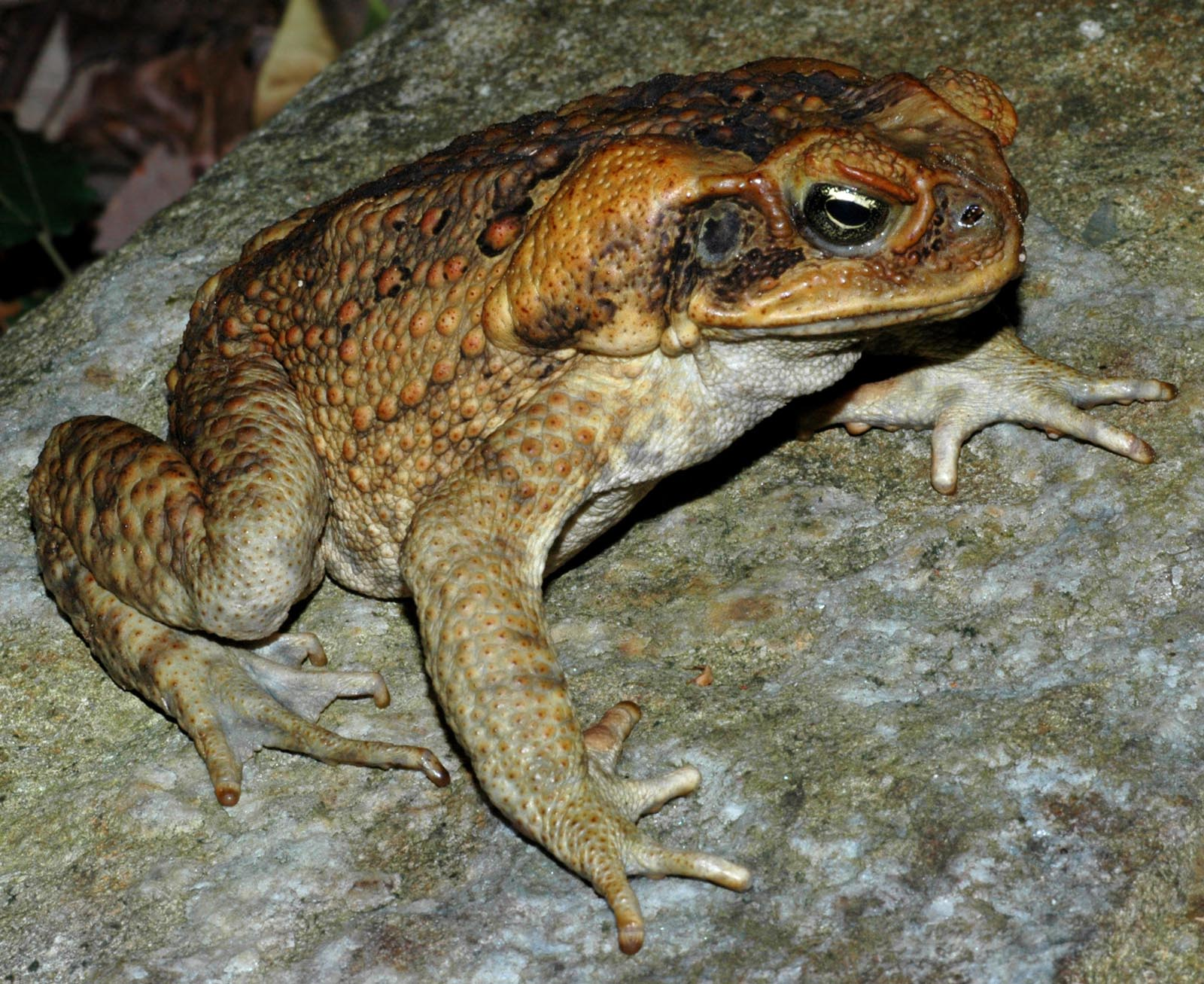
Tropical frogs (Leptodactylidae)
Species	Common name(s)	Notes	Image
Eleutherodactylus johnstonei	Lesser Antillean whistling frog, coqui Antillano, Johnstone's whistling frog	Least concern.
Eleutherodactylus shrevei		Endangered. Endemic. Restricted to pristine montane forest.
Leptodactylus validus	Windward ditch frog	Least concern. Regional endemic. Typically found in forest habitats, but may venture into human-altered areas.
True toads (Bufonidae)
Species	Common name(s)	Notes	Image
Bufo marinus	Cane toad, giant Neotropical toad, marine toad	Least concern. Introduced.

== Reptiles ==
Including marine turtles and introduced species, there are 16 reptile species reported on Saint Vincent, three of which are endemic.

=== Turtles (Testudines) ===
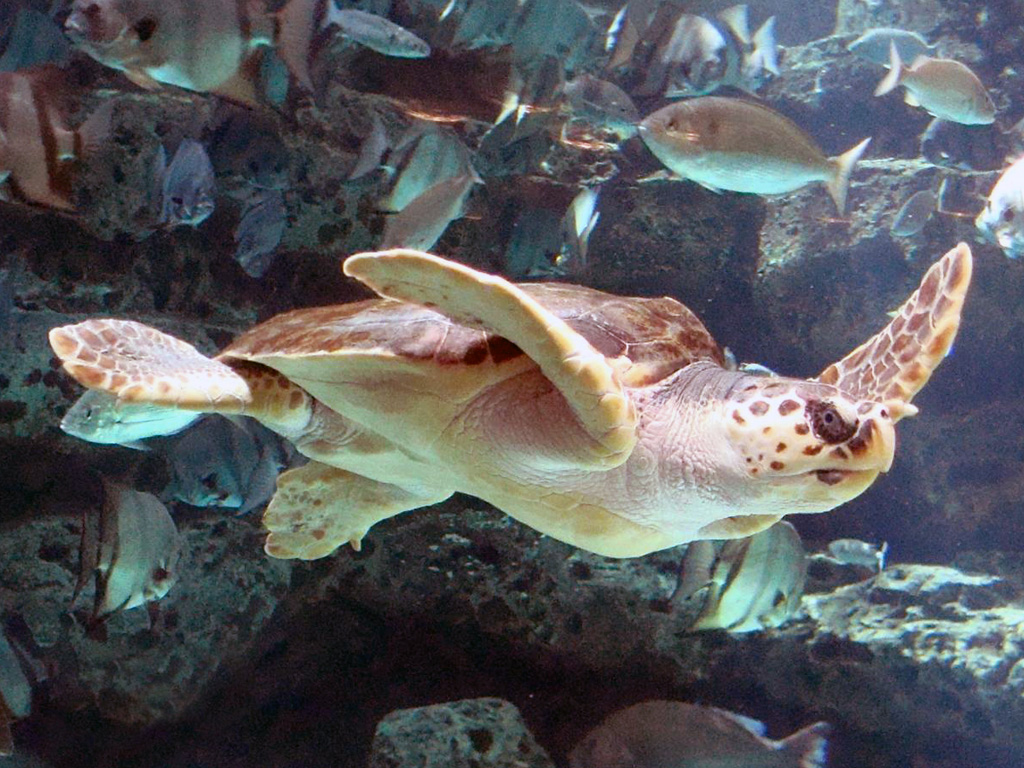
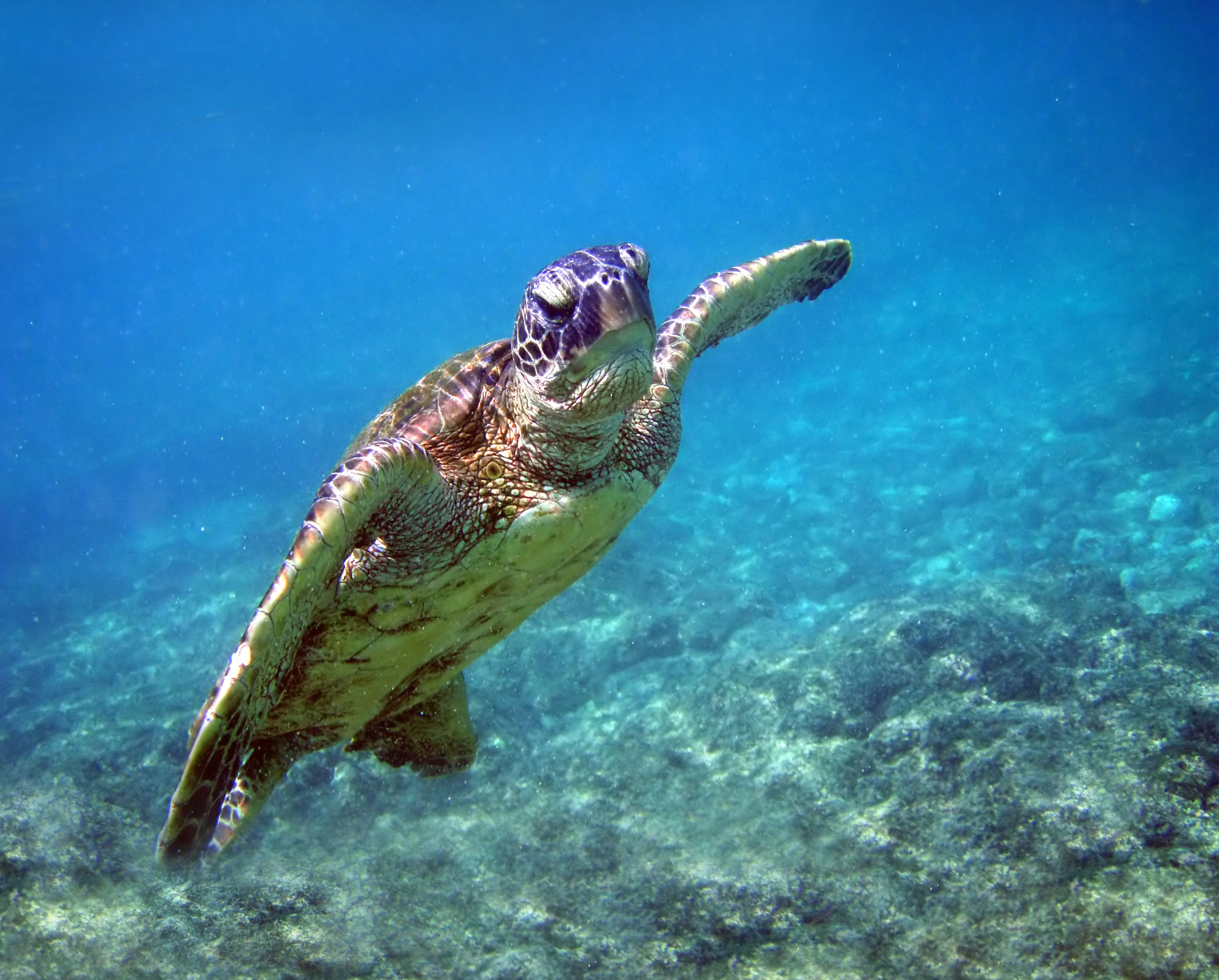
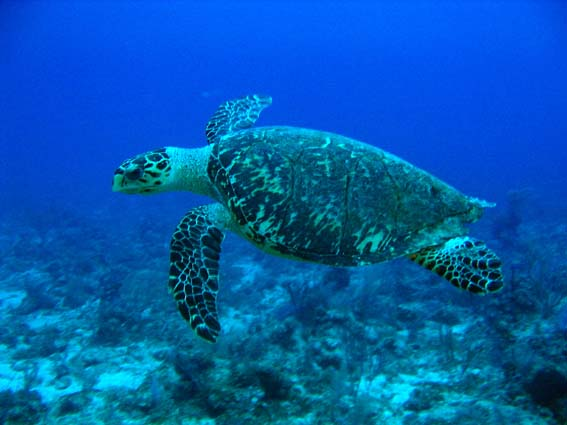
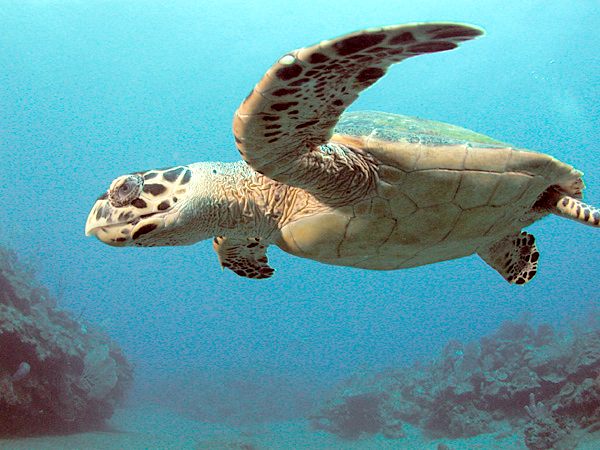
Scaly sea turtles (Cheloniidae)
Species	Common name(s)	Notes	Image
Caretta caretta	Loggerhead turtle	Endangered.
Chelonia mydas	Green turtle	Endangered.
Eretmochelys imbricata	Hawksbill turtle	Critically endangered.
Leathery sea turtles (Dermochelyidae)
Species	Common name(s)	Notes	Image
Dermochelys coriacea	Leatherback turtle	Critically endangered.

=== Lizards and snakes (Squamata) ===
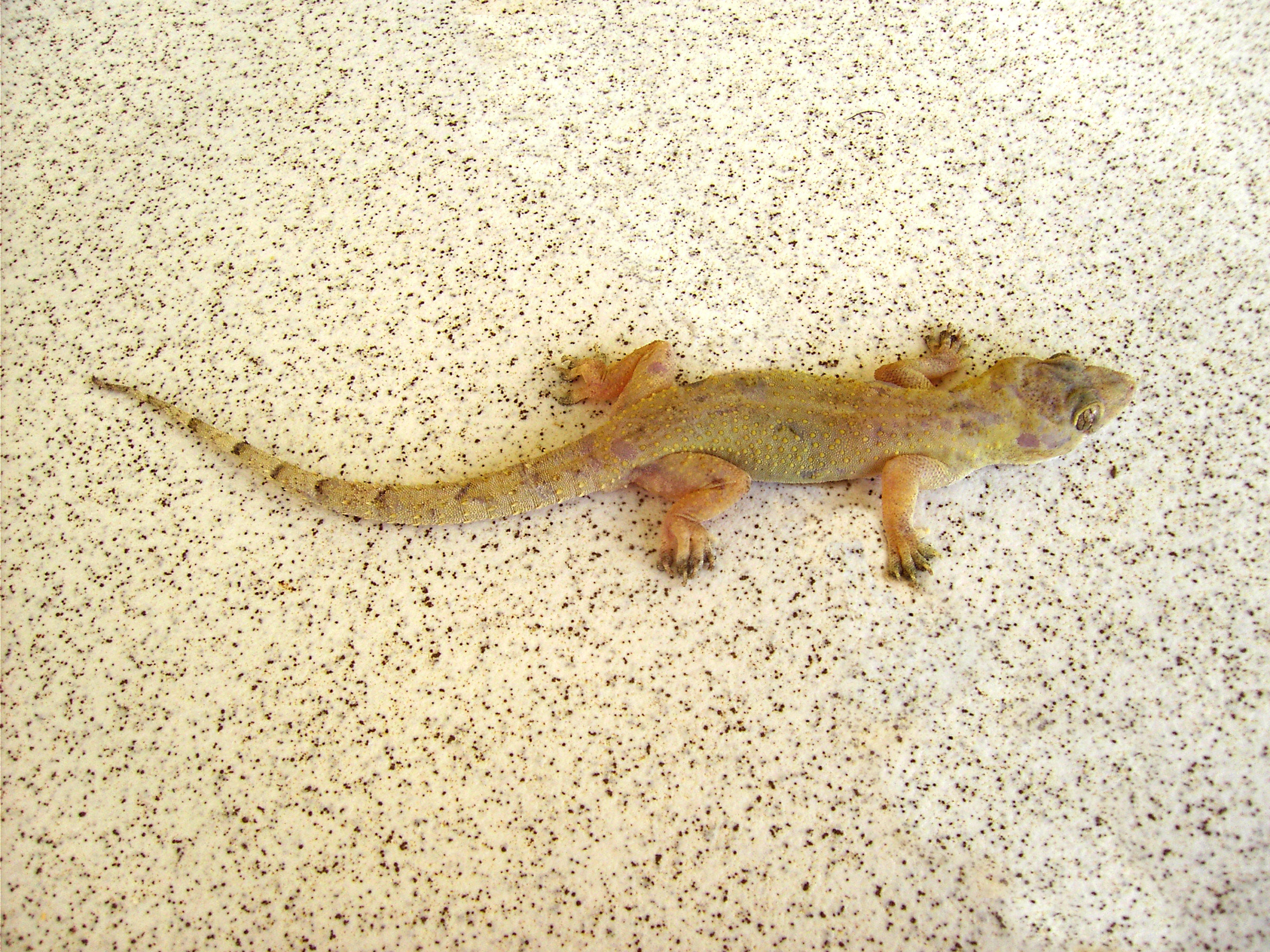
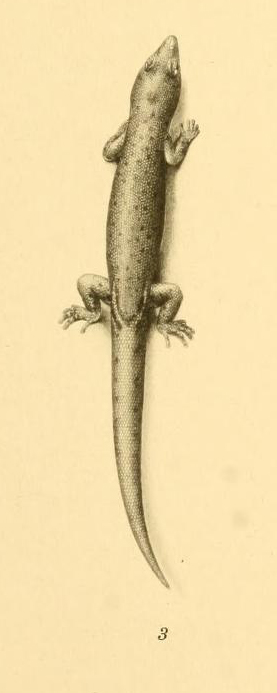
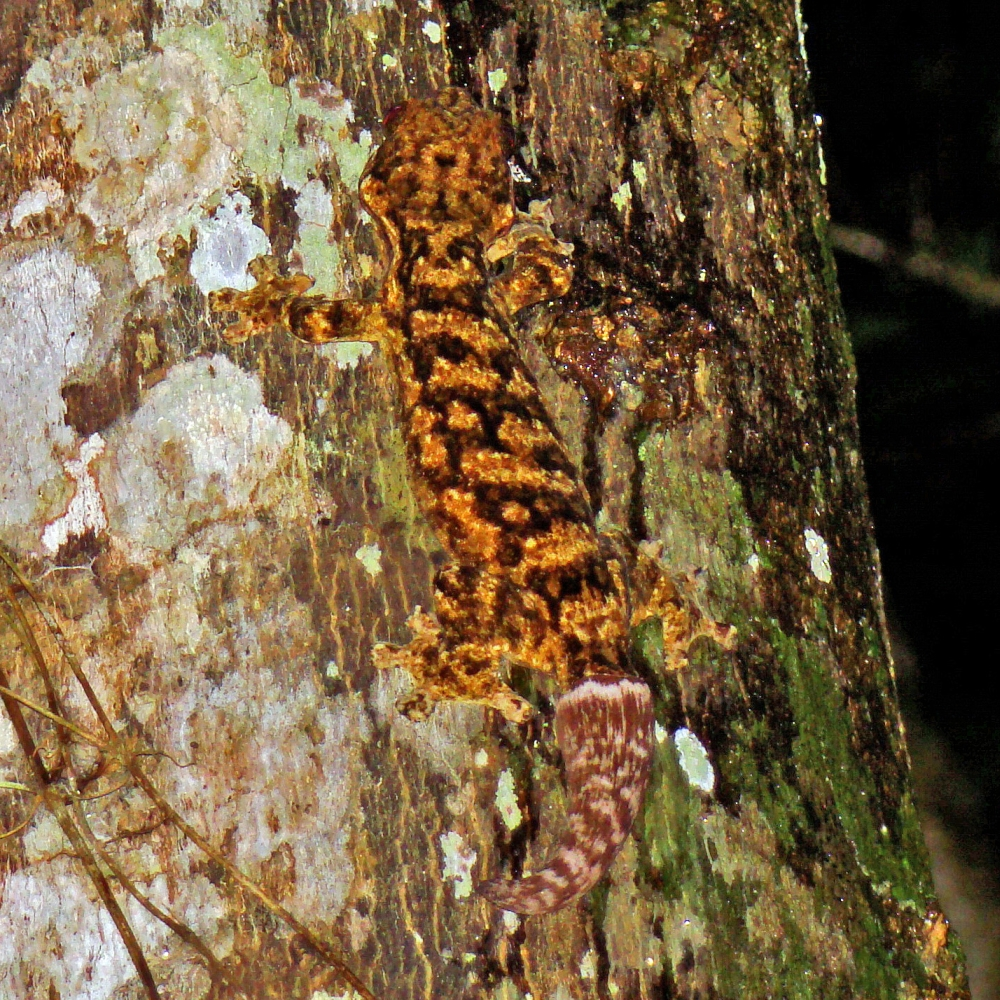
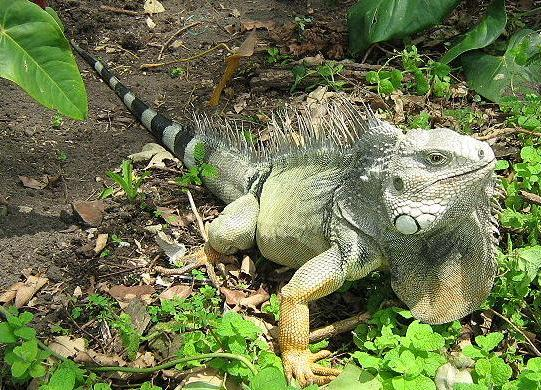
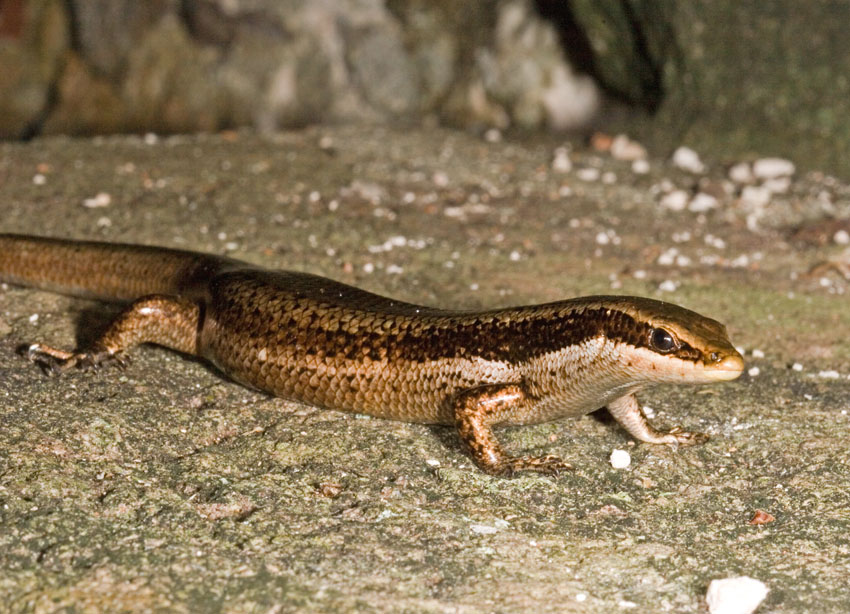
Geckos (Gekkonidae)
Species	Common name(s)	Notes	Image
Hemidactylus mabouia	House gecko	Introduced.
Sphaerodactylus vincenti	Vincent's least gecko	Regional endemic.
Thecadactylus rapicauda	Turnip-tailed gecko
Iguanas and anolids (Iguanidae)
Species	Common name(s)	Notes	Image
Anolis griseus	Saint Vincent's tree anole	Endemic. Widely distributed from sea level to 900 m.
Anolis trinitatis	Saint Vincent's bush anole, Trinidad anole	Regional endemic. Widely distributed from sea level to 900 m.
Iguana iguana	Green iguana, common iguana
Microteiids (Gymnophthalmidae)
Species	Common name(s)	Notes	Image
Gymnophthalmus underwoodi	Underwood's spectacled tegu
Skinks (Scincidae)
Species	Common name(s)	Notes	Image
Mabuya mabouya		Regional endemic. Possibly extirpated.
Boas (Boidae)
Species	Common name(s)	Notes	Image
Corallus cookii	Cook's tree boa	Endemic. Found in many habitats, though uncommon in rain forest.
Colubrids (Colubridae)
Species	Common name(s)	Notes	Image
Chironius vincenti	Saint Vincent blacksnake	Critically endangered. Endemic. Probably restricted to elevations between 150 and 330 m.
Mastigodryas bruesi	Barbour's tropical racer	Regional endemic. Found in xeric habitats in the southwest.

== See also ==
- List of amphibians and reptiles of the Grenadines
