= List of amphibians and reptiles of Grenada =

Location of Grenada in the Caribbean.

This is a list of amphibians and reptiles found on Grenada, an island in the Caribbean Lesser Antilles.

== Amphibians ==
There are four species of amphibian on Grenada, one of which was introduced. One species, Eleutherodactylus euphronides, is endemic to Grenada.

=== Frogs (Anura) ===
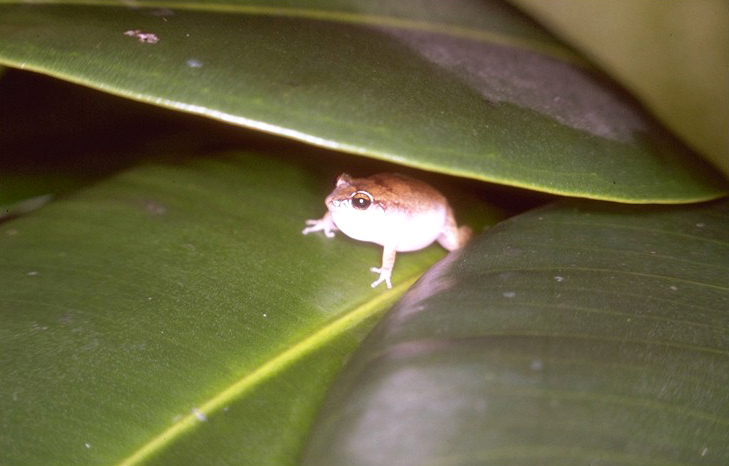
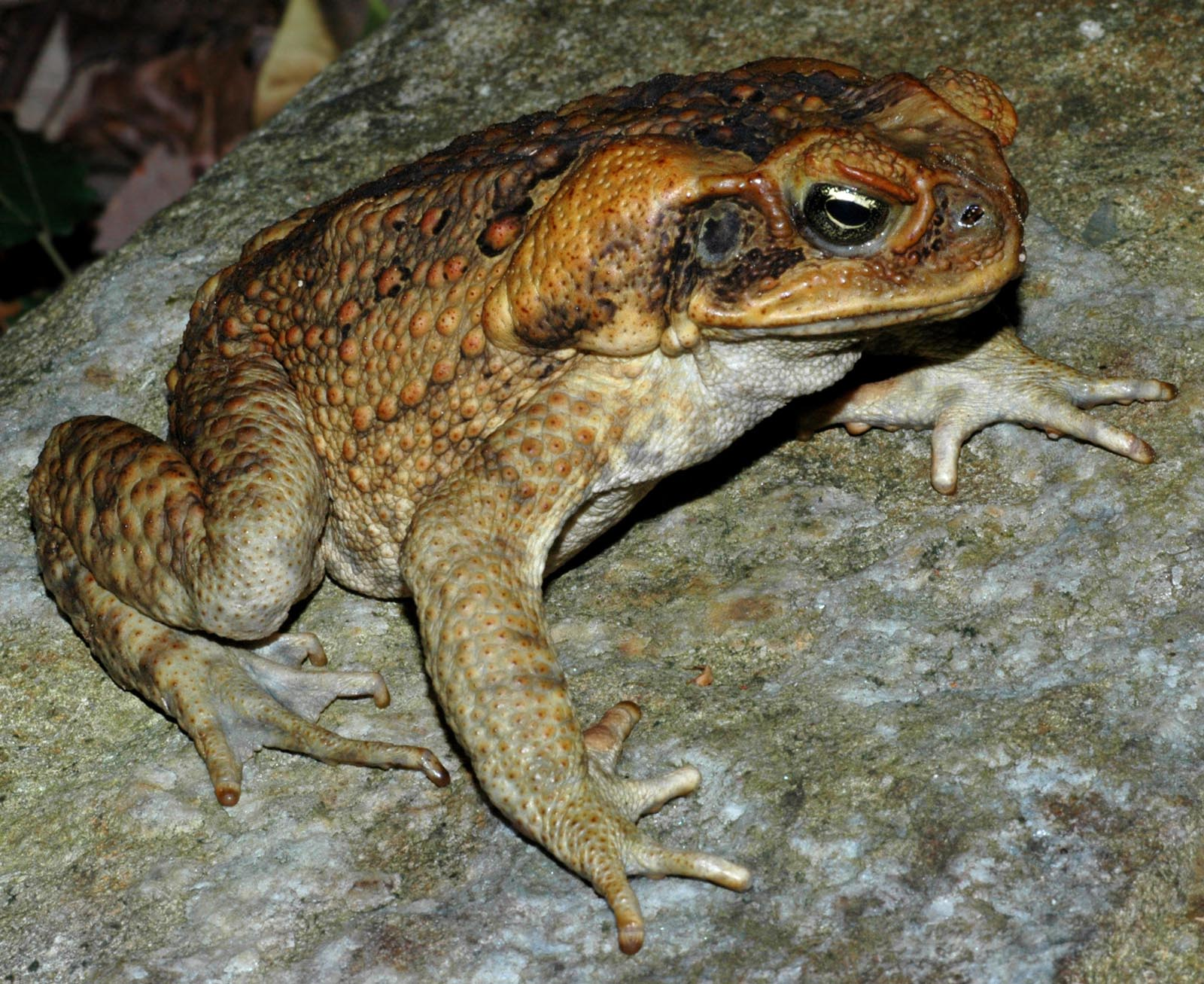
Tropical frogs (Leptodactylidae)
Species	Common name(s)	Notes	Image
Eleutherodactylus euphronides		Endangered. Endemic.
Eleutherodactylus johnstonei	Lesser Antillean whistling frog, coqui antillano, Johnstone's whistling frog	Least concern.
Leptodactylus validus	Windward ditch frog	Least concern. Regional endemic.
True toads (Bufonidae)
Species	Common name(s)	Notes	Image
Bufo marinus	Cane toad, giant Neotropical toad, marine toad	Least concern. Introduced.

== Reptiles ==
Including marine turtles and introduced species, there are 20 reptile species reported on Grenada, though the status of four species is uncertain.

=== Turtles (Testudines) ===
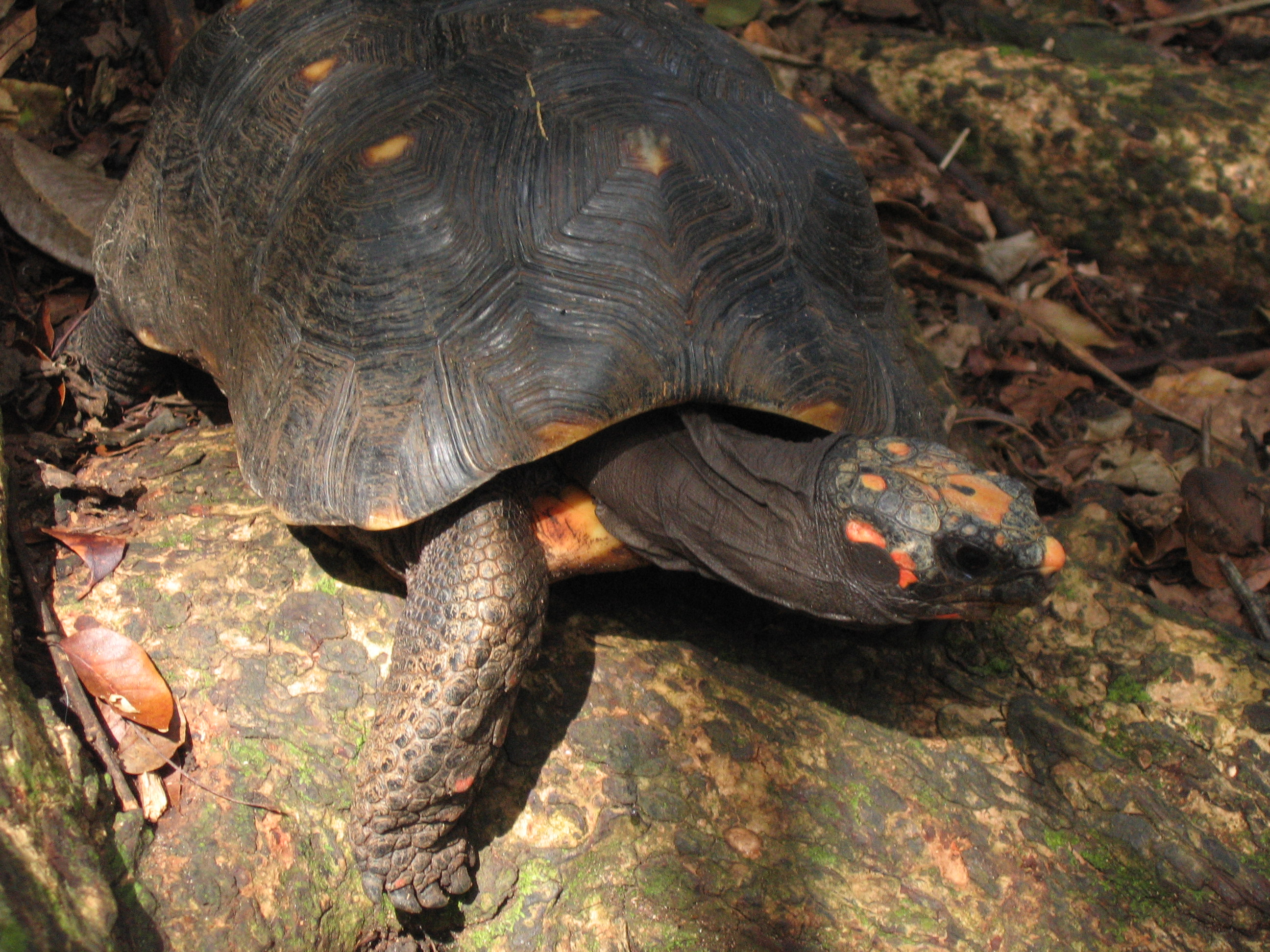
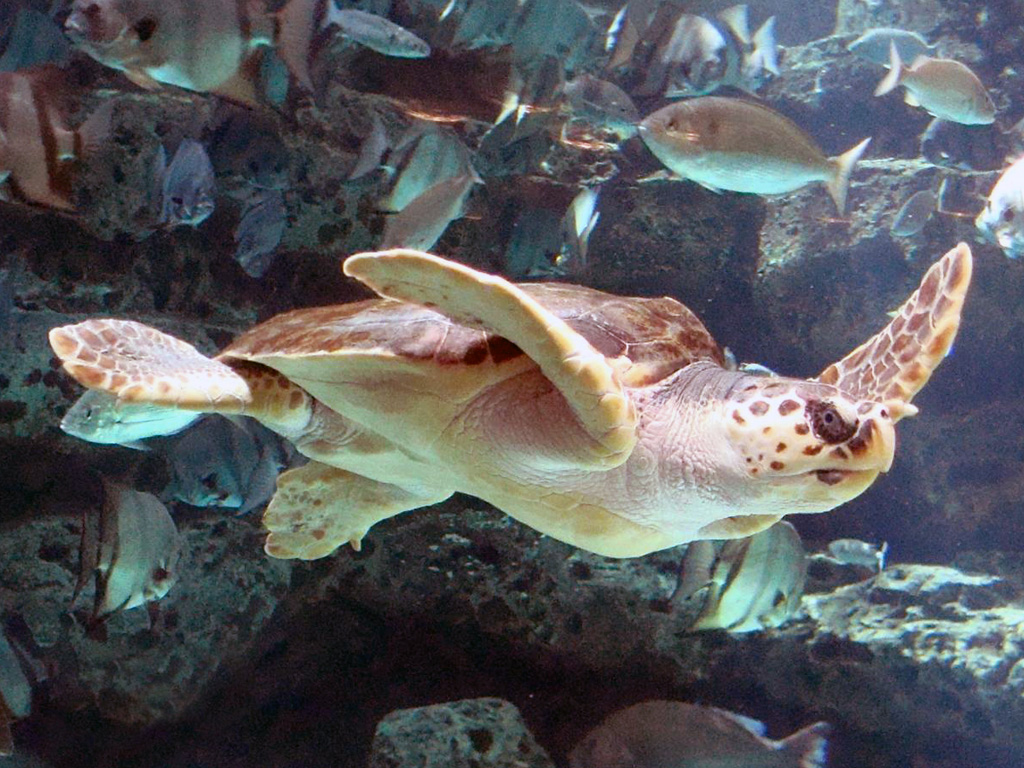
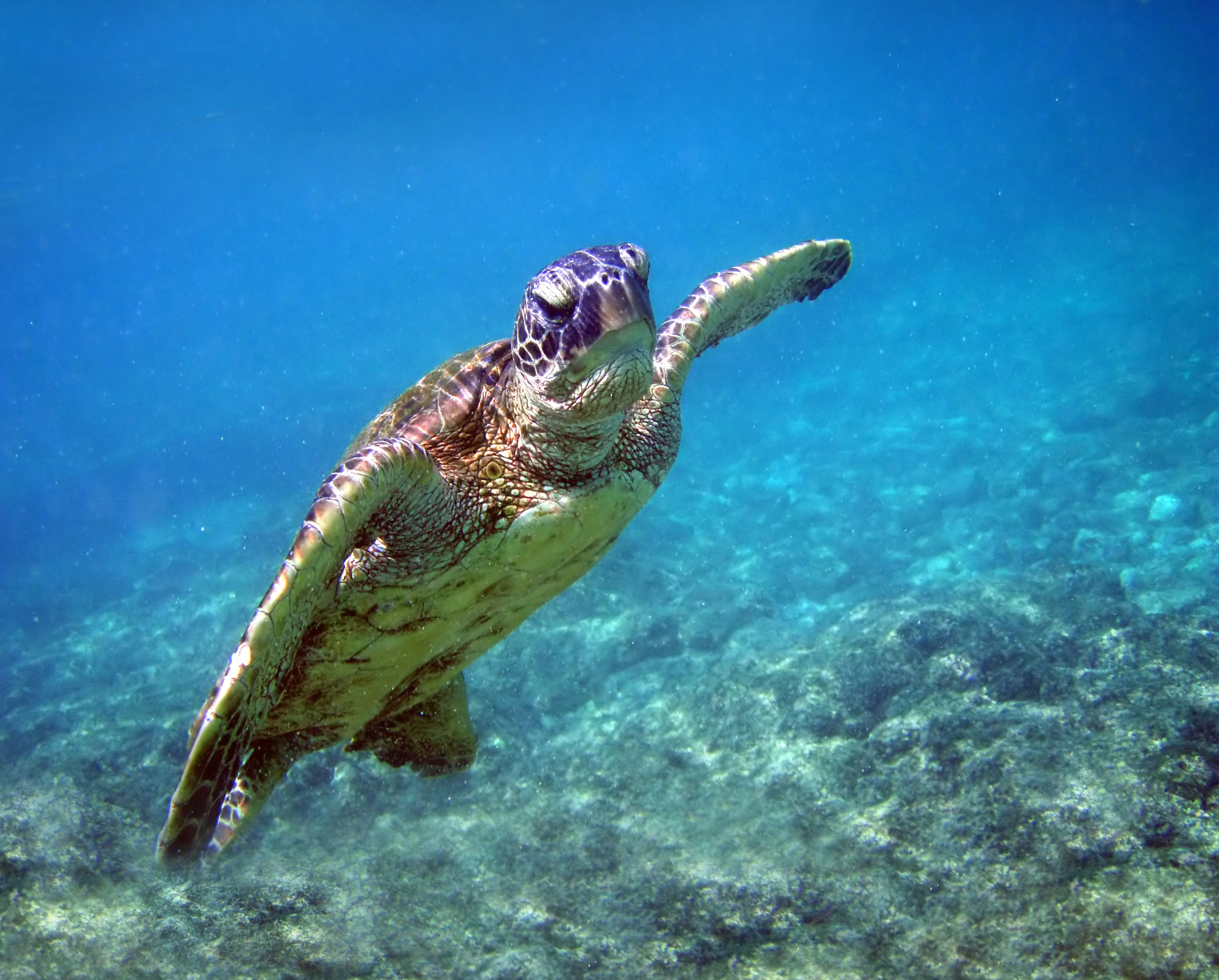
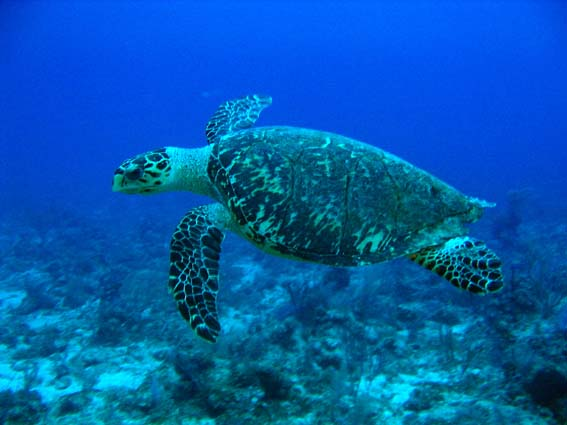
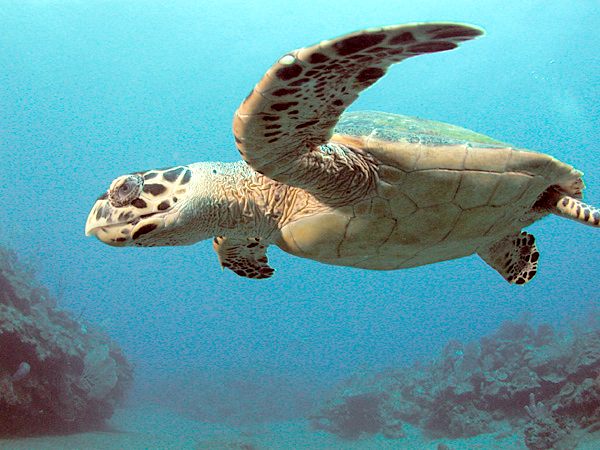
Tortoises (Testudinidae)
Species	Common name(s)	Notes	Image
Geochelone carbonaria	Red-footed tortoise	Introduced.
Scaly sea turtles (Cheloniidae)
Species	Common name(s)	Notes	Image
Caretta caretta	Loggerhead turtle	Endangered.
Chelonia mydas	Green turtle	Endangered.
Eretmochelys imbricata	Hawksbill turtle	Critically Endangered.
Leathery sea turtles (Dermochelyidae)
Species	Common name(s)	Notes	Image
Dermochelys coriacea	Leatherback turtle	Critically endangered.

=== Lizards and snakes (Squamata) ===
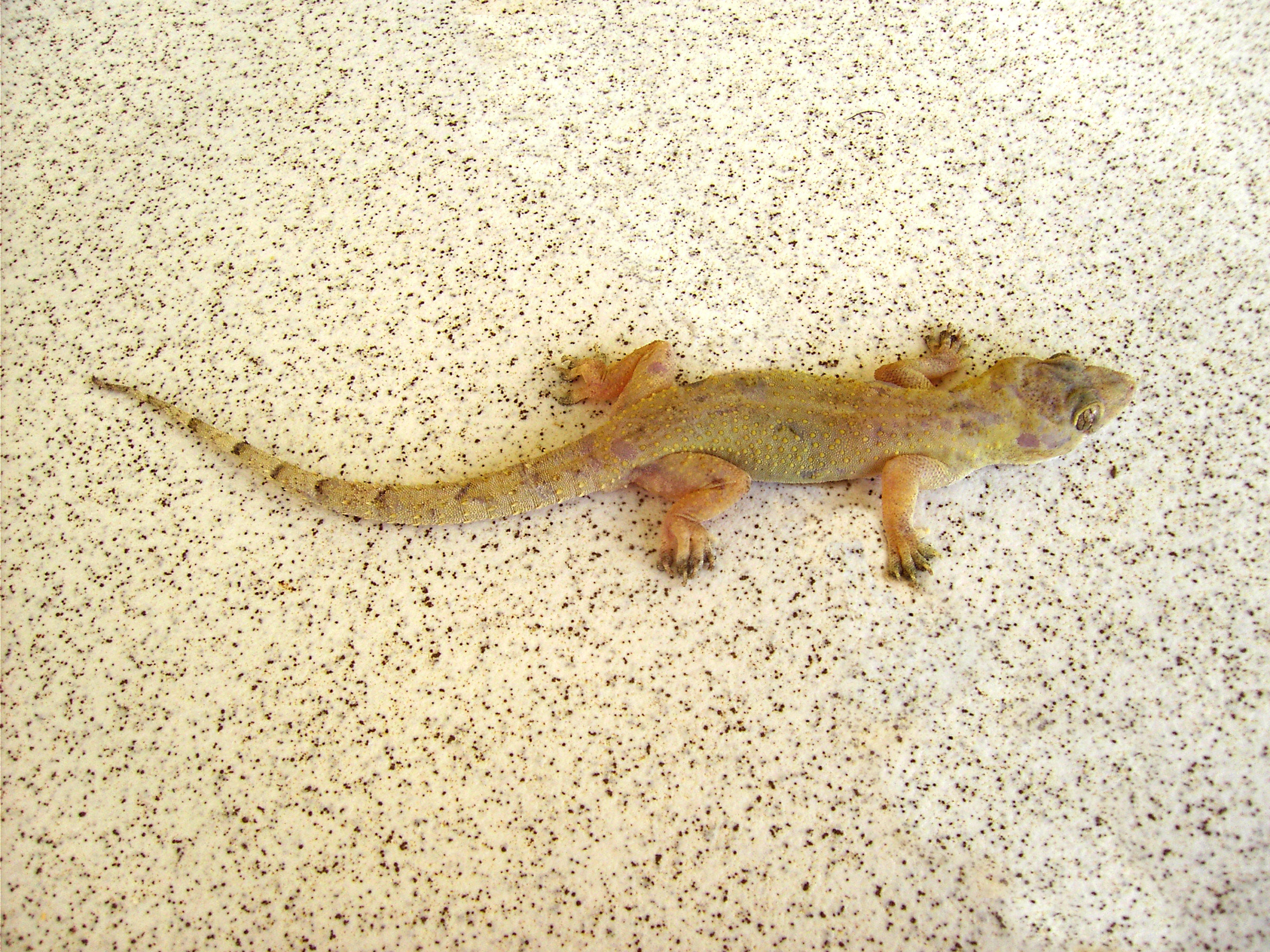
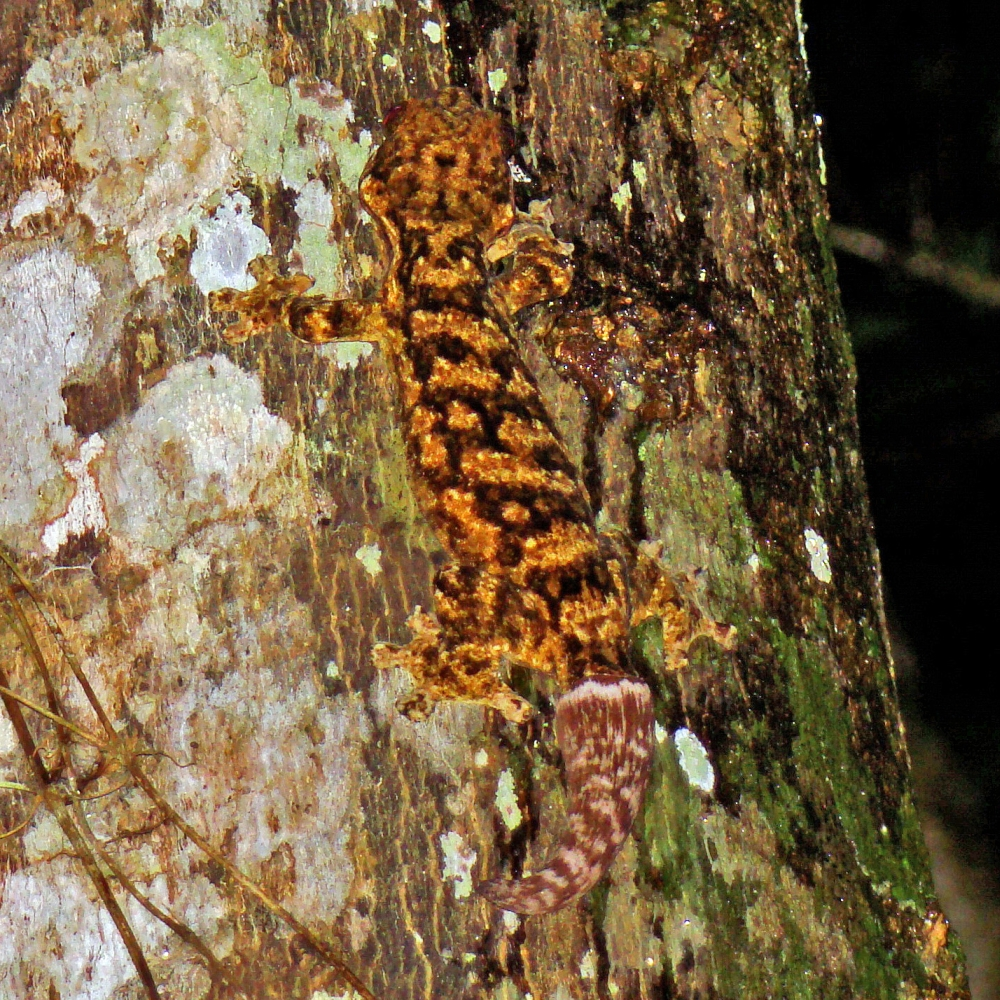
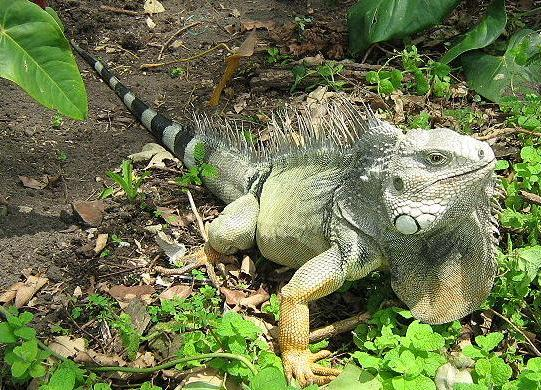
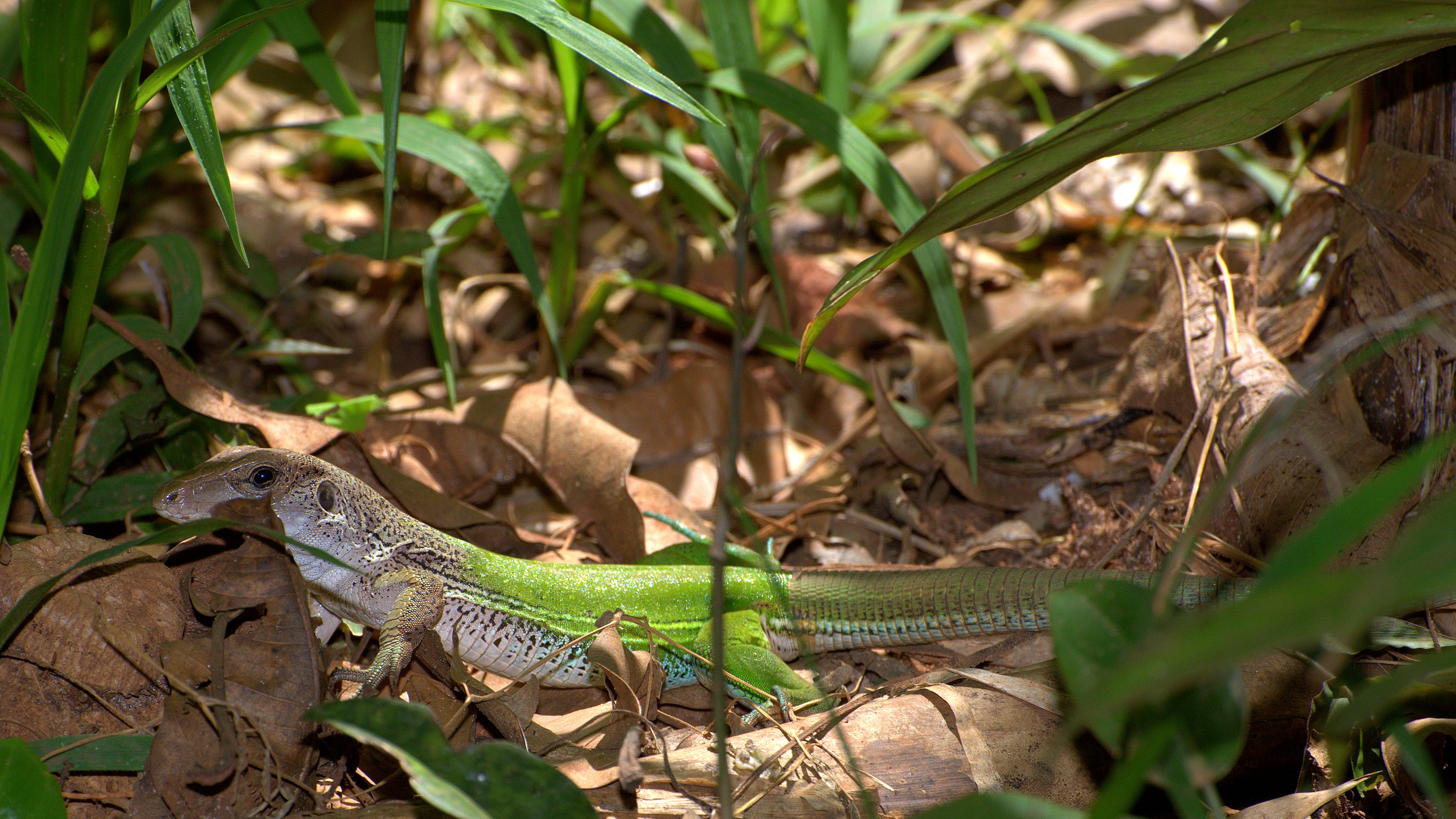
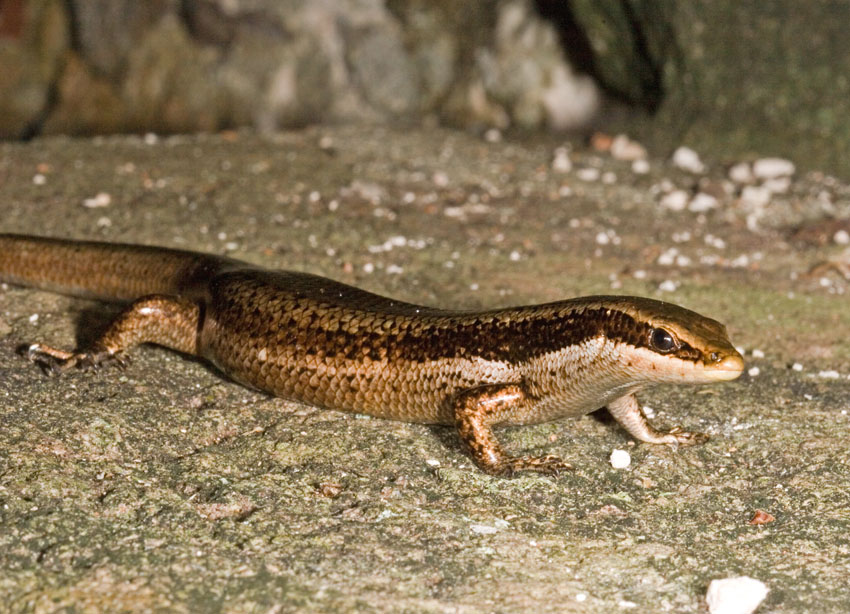
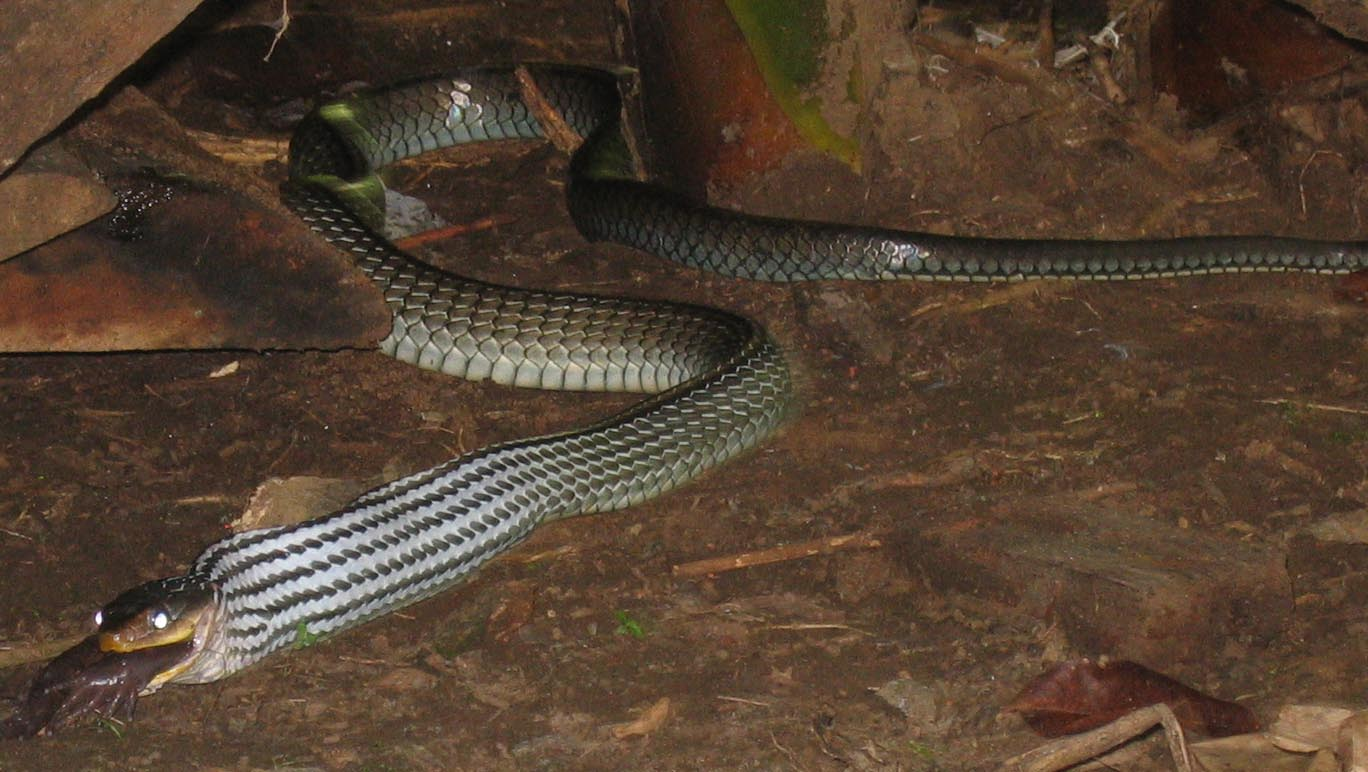
Geckos (Gekkonidae)
Species	Common name(s)	Notes	Image
Hemidactylus mabouia	House gecko	Introduced.
Thecadactylus rapicauda	Turnip-tailed gecko
Iguanas and Anolids (Iguanidae)
Species	Common name(s)	Notes	Image
Anolis aeneus	Bronze anole
Anolis richardii	Grenada tree anole
Iguana iguana	Green iguana, common iguana
Whiptails (Teiidae)
Species	Common name(s)	Notes	Image
Ameiva ameiva	Giant ameiva	Found throughout the Grenadines.
Microteiids (Gymnophthalmidae)
Species	Common name(s)	Notes	Image
Bachia heteropa	LaGuaira Bachia
Skinks (Scincidae)
Species	Common name(s)	Notes	Image
Mabuya mabouya		Regional endemic. Possibly extirpated.
Worm snakes (Typhlopidae)
Species	Common name(s)	Notes	Image
Typhlops tasymicris	Grenada worm snake	Endemic.
Boas (Boidae)
Species	Common name(s)	Notes	Image
Corallus grenadensis	Grenadian tree boa
Colubrids (Colubridae)
Species	Common name(s)	Notes	Image
Clelia clelia	Mussurana	Possibly extirpated from Grenada.
Liophis melanotus	Shaw's black-backed snake, Shaw's dark ground snake	Possibly extirpated from Grenada.
Mastigodryas bruesi	Barbour's tropical racer	Regional endemic. Recorded from the southern half of Grenada, which is the southern limit of the species' range.
Pseudoboa neuwiedi	Neuwied's false boa, coal snake	Possibly extirpated from Grenada.

== See also ==
- List of amphibians and reptiles of the Grenadines
