= List of amphibians and reptiles of the Grenadines =

Map of the Grenadines, between Saint Vincent and Grenada.

This is a list of amphibians and reptiles found in the Grenadines, a chain of over 600 small islands located in the Caribbean Lesser Antilles. Politically, the northern two-thirds of the Grenadines are part of the nation Saint Vincent and the Grenadines; the remainder is part of Grenada.

== Amphibians ==
There are two species of amphibian in the Grenadines, one of which was introduced.

=== Frogs (Anura) ===
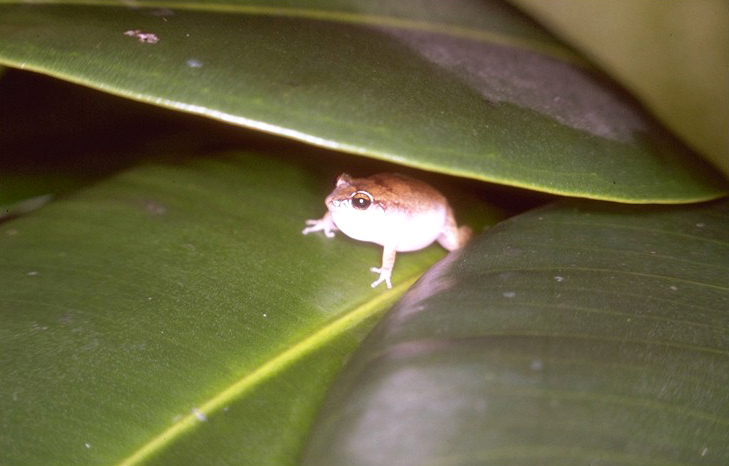
Tropical frogs (Leptodactylidae)
| Species | Common name(s) | Notes | Image |
|---|---|---|---|
| Eleutherodactylus johnstonei | Lesser Antillean Whistling Frog, Coqui Antillano, Johnstone's Whistling Frog | Least Concern. Recently introduced. |
| Leptodactylus validus | Windward Ditch Frog | Least Concern. Regional endemic. Recorded only on Bequia. |

== Reptiles ==
Including marine turtles and introduced species, there are 19 reptile species reported in the Grenadines.

=== Turtles (Testudines) ===
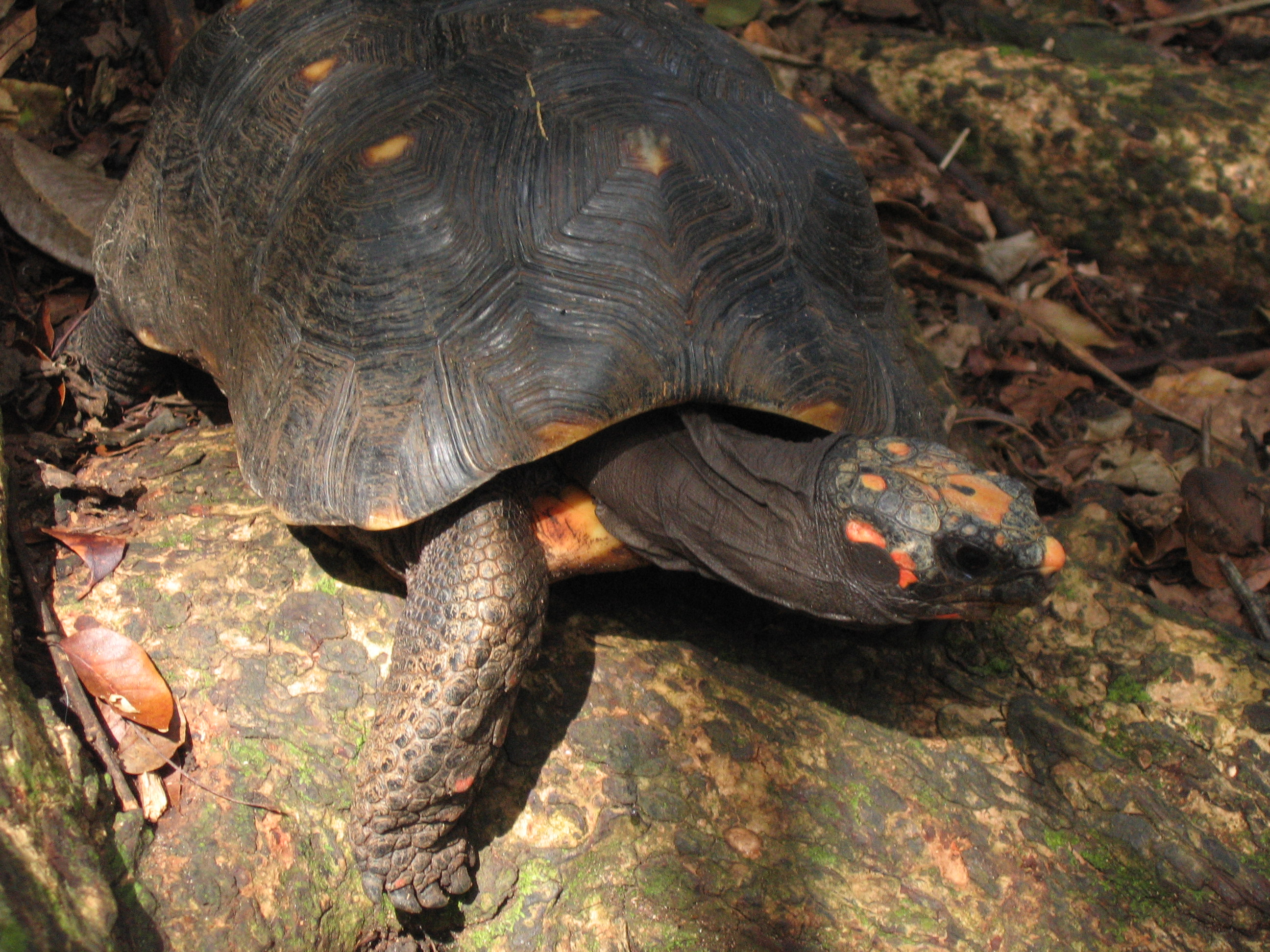
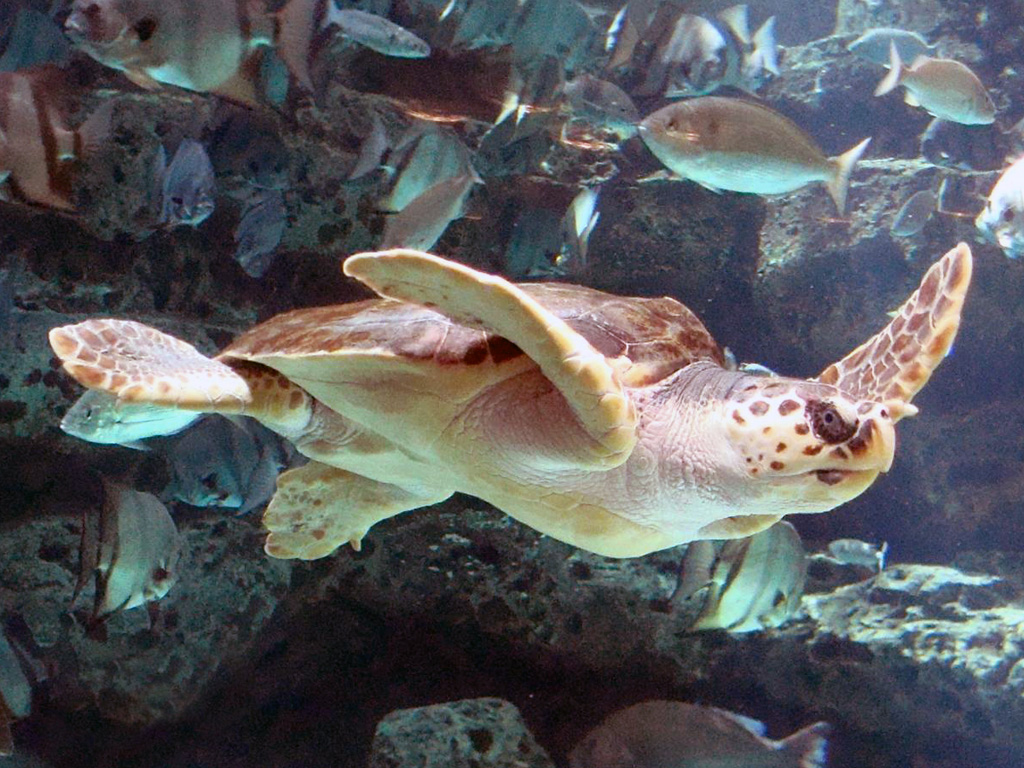
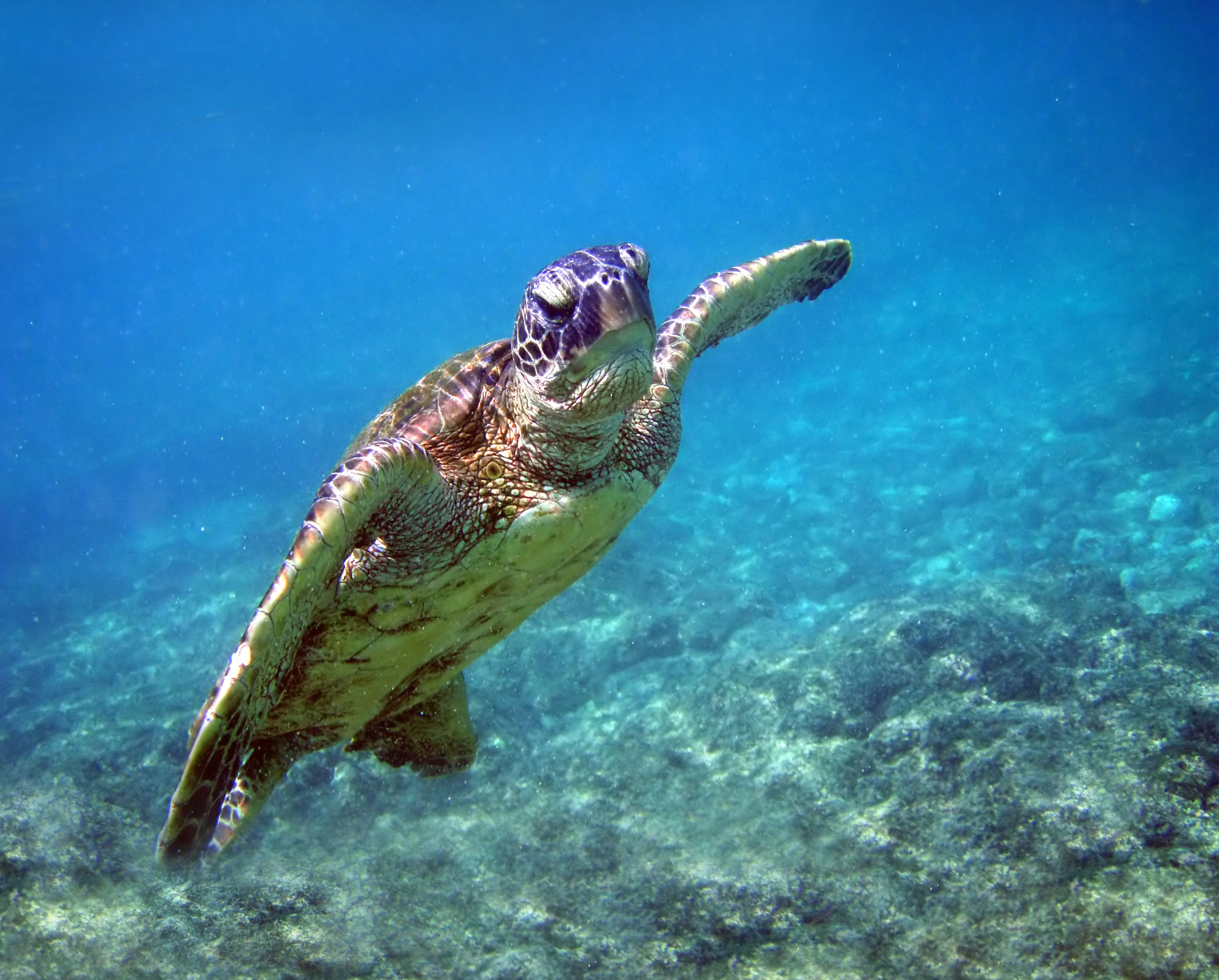
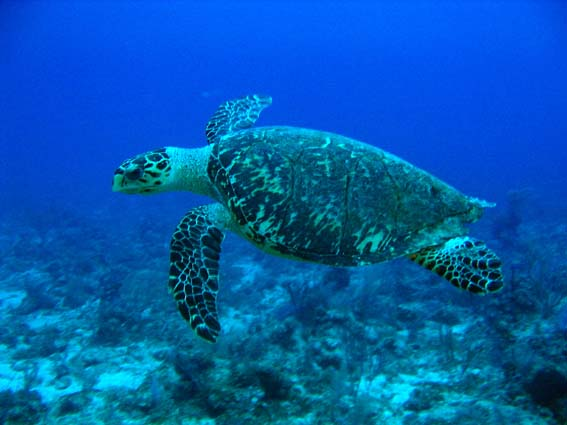
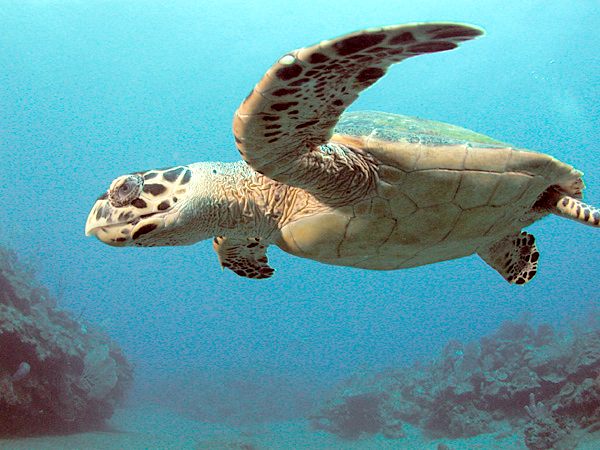
Tortoises (Testudinidae)
| Species | Common name(s) | Notes | Image |
|---|---|---|---|
| Chelonoidis carbonarius | Red-Footed Tortoise, Morrocoy |
Scaly sea turtles (Cheloniidae)
| Species | Common name(s) | Notes | Image |
| Caretta caretta | Loggerhead Turtle | Endangered. |
| Chelonia mydas | Green Turtle | Endangered. |
| Eretmochelys imbricata | Hawksbill Turtle | Critically Endangered. |
Leathery sea turtles (Dermochelyidae)
| Species | Common name(s) | Notes | Image |
| Dermochelys coriacea | Leatherback Turtle | Critically Endangered. |

=== Lizards and snakes (Squamata) ===
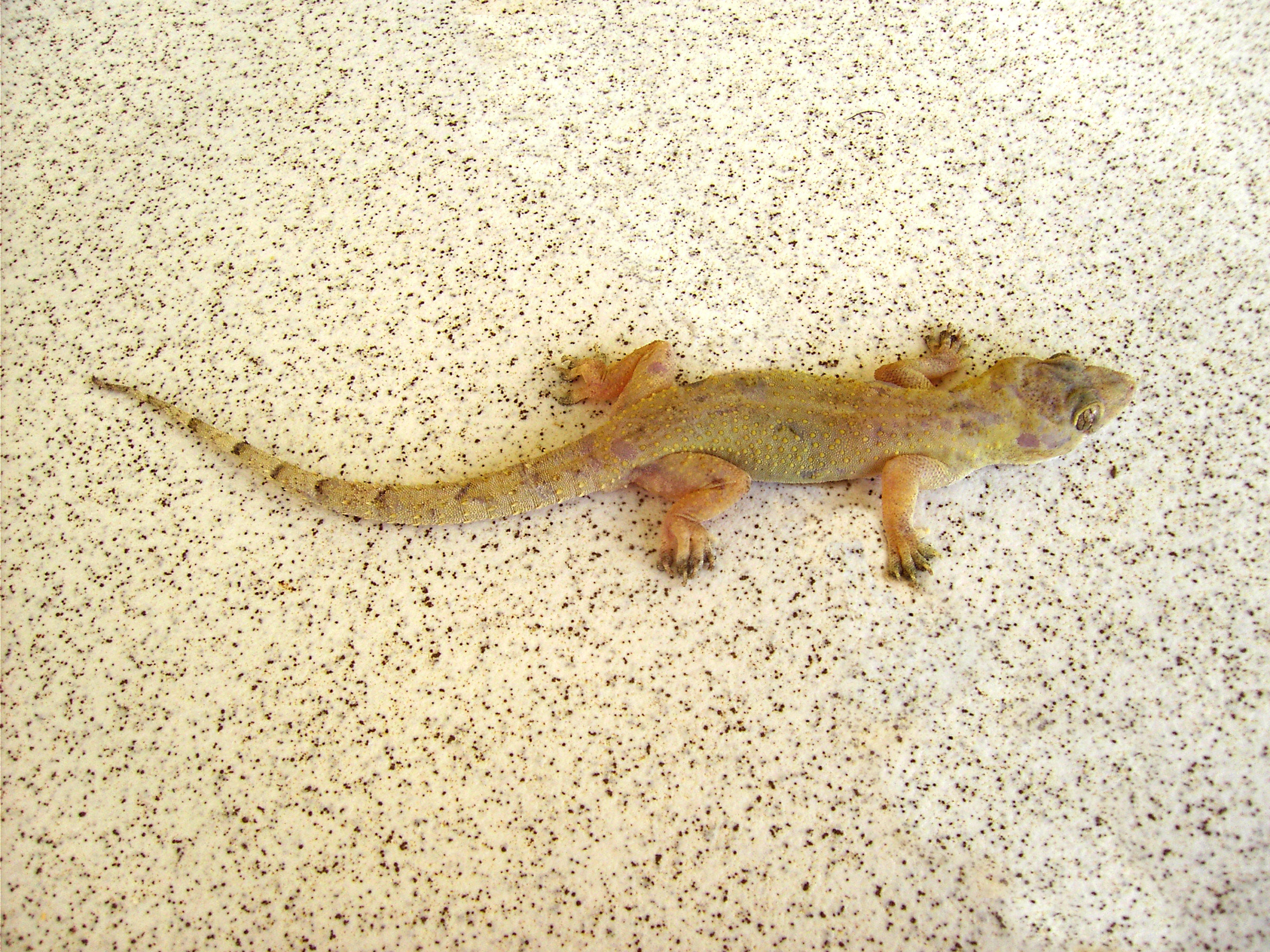
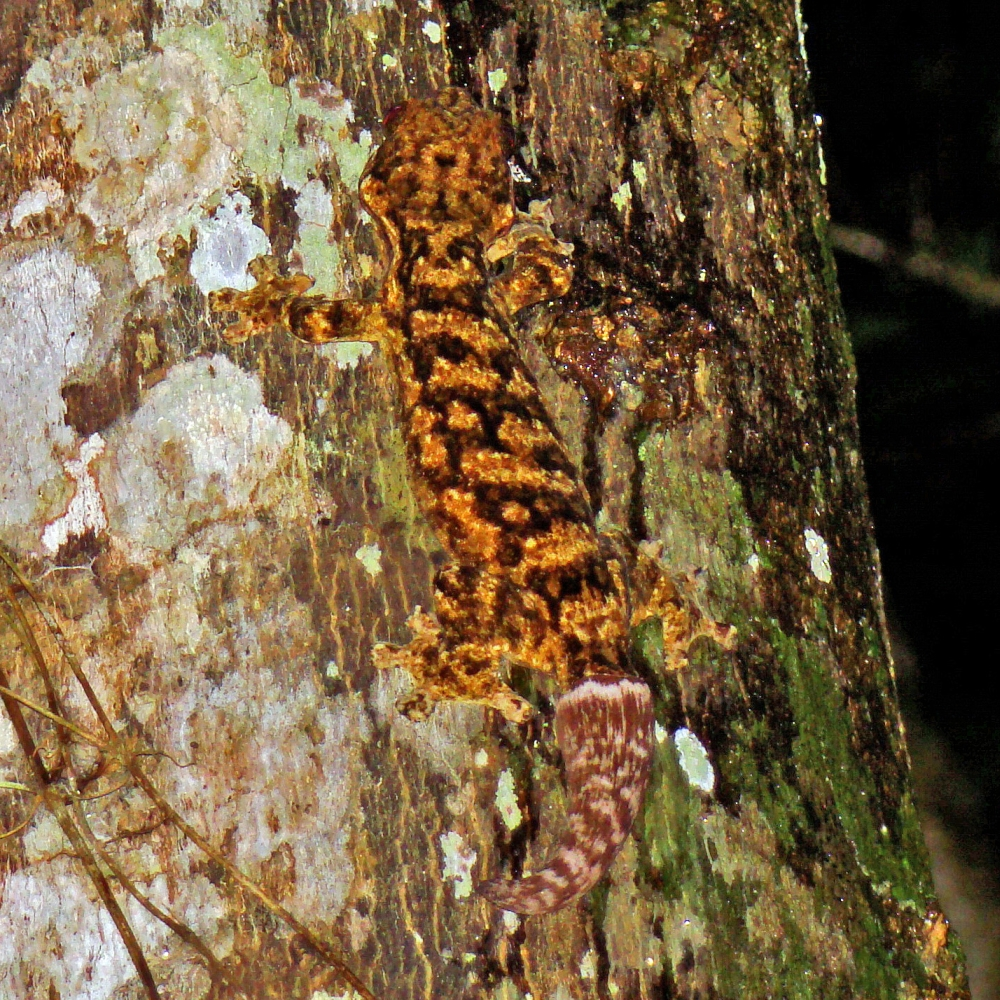
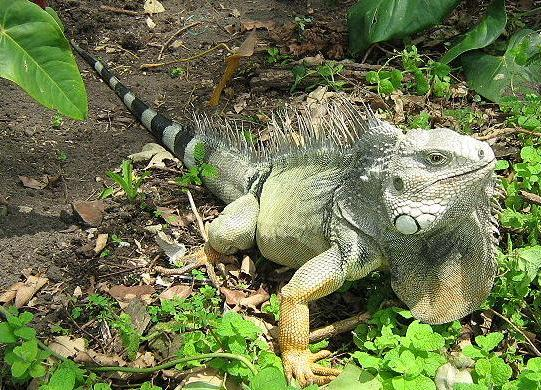
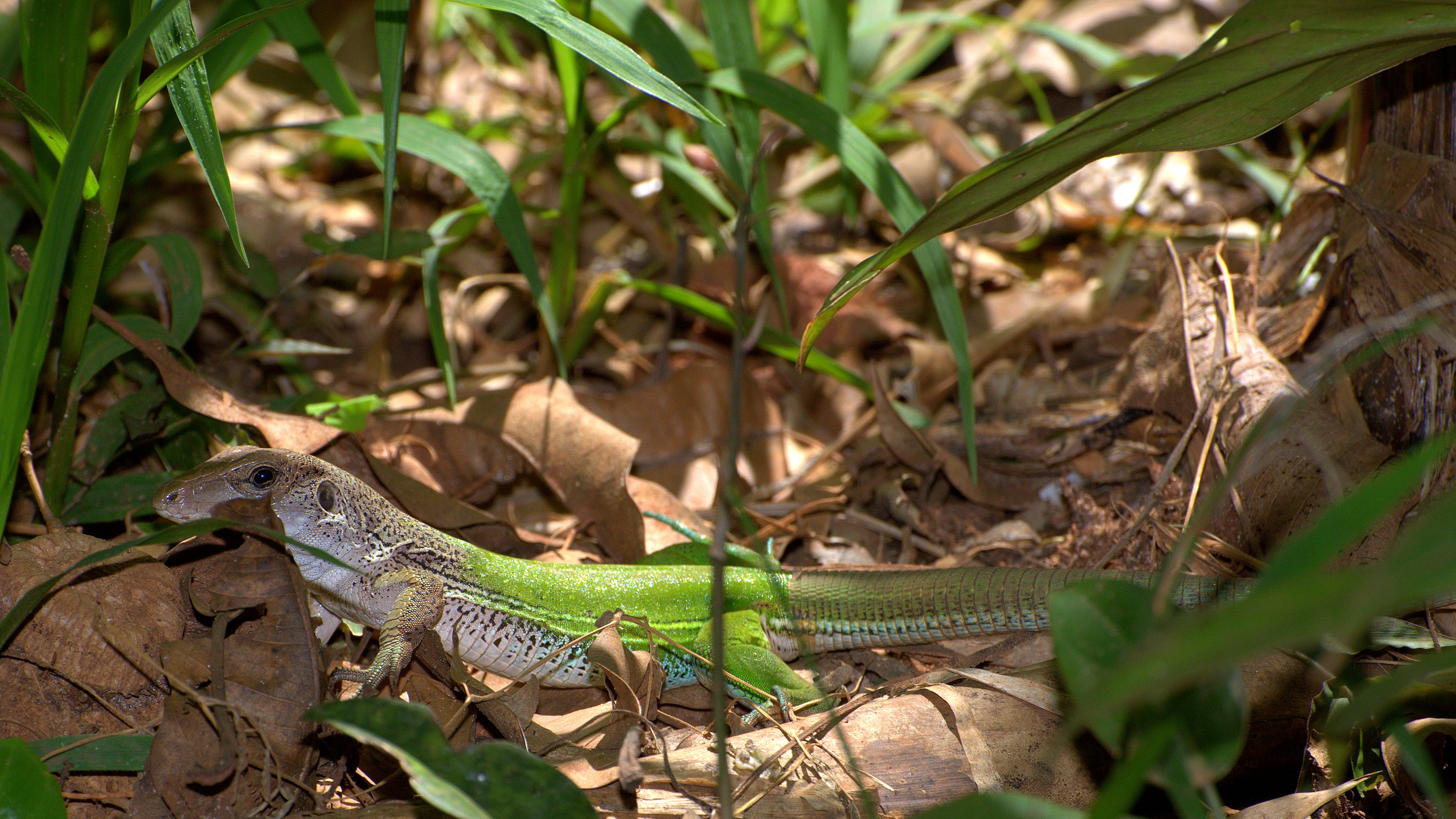
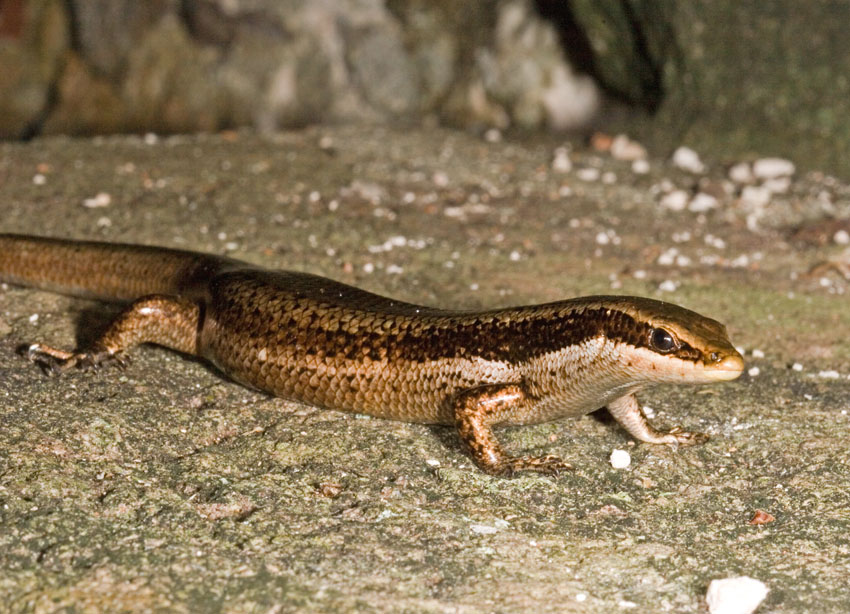
Geckos (Gekkonidae)
| Species | Common name(s) | Notes | Image |
|---|---|---|---|
| Gonatodes daudini | Union Island gecko | restricted to leaf litter in mature upland dry forest on Union Island. |
| Hemidactylus mabouia | House Gecko | Introduced. |
| Sphaerodactylus kirbyi | | Endemic; found only on Bequia. |
| Thecadactylus rapicauda | Turnip-Tailed Gecko |
Iguanas and Anolids (Iguanidae)
| Species | Common name(s) | Notes | Image |
| Anolis aeneus | Bronze Anole | Found throughout the Grenadines. |
| Anolis richardii | Grenada Tree Anole | Found on Carriacou and Bequia. |
| Iguana iguana | Green Iguana, Common Iguana |
Whiptails (Teiidae)
| Species | Common name(s) | Notes | Image |
| Ameiva ameiva | Giant Ameiva | Found throughout the Grenadines. |
Microteiids (Gymnophthalmidae)
| Species | Common name(s) | Notes | Image |
| Bachia heteropa | LaGuaira Bachia | Recorded on Canouan and Bequia. |
| Gymnophthalmus underwoodi | Underwood's Spectacled Tegu | Recorded on Bequia. |
Skinks (Scincidae)
| Species | Common name(s) | Notes | Image |
| Mabuya mabouya | | Regional endemic. Possibly extirpated. |
Boas (Boidae)
| Species | Common name(s) | Notes | Image |
| Corallus grenadensis | Grenadian Tree Boa | Recorded on Bequia, Isle de Quatre, Union Island, Carriacou, and Petit Martinique. |
Colubrids (Colubridae)
| Species | Common name(s) | Notes | Image |
| Mastigodryas bruesi | Barbour's Tropical Racer | Regional endemic. Widespread, in xeric habitats. |

== See also ==
- List of amphibians and reptiles of Saint Vincent
- List of amphibians and reptiles of Grenada
