= Anolis griseus =

Conservation status
- Least Concern (IUCN 3.1)

Scientific classification
- Kingdom: Animalia
- Phylum: Chordata
- Class: Reptilia
- Order: Squamata
- Suborder: Iguania
- Family: Dactyloidae
- Genus: Anolis
- Species: A. griseus

Binomial name
- Anolis griseus Garman, 1887

Species of lizard

Anolis griseus, the Saint Vincent's tree anole or Saint Vincent tree anole, is a species of anole lizard.

== Geographic range ==
It is endemic to Saint Vincent, an island in the Caribbean Lesser Antilles that is part of Saint Vincent and the Grenadines. It is one of two anole species on Saint Vincent, the other being the much smaller A. trinitatis.

== Description ==
Saint Vincent's tree anole can reach a length of 136 mm (5.4 in) snout-to-vent. Its dorsal surface is mossy gray-brown, occasionally with a yellow tint on its face and limbs. Its belly is pale green or yellow-gray, and its dewlap is dull orange. It has irregular dark markings on its body.

== Behavior ==
It usually perches high, but sometimes descends to the ground.

== See also ==
- List of Anolis lizards
