= Louis Claude Richard =

French botanist (1754–1821)

- Born: 19 September 1754; Versailles, France
- Died: 6 June 1821 (aged 66); Paris
- Known for: Demonstrations botaniques (1808), De Orchideis europaeis (1817) and other books
- Children: Achille Richard (son)
- Scientific career
- Fields: Botanist, botanical illustrator
- Institutions: École de médecine, Paris
- Author abbrev. (botany): Rich.

Louis Claude Marie Richard (French pronunciation: [lwi klod maʁi ʁiʃaʁ]; 19 September 1754 – 6 June 1821) was a French botanist and botanical illustrator. The standard author abbreviation Rich. is used to indicate this person as the author when citing a botanical name.

== Biography ==
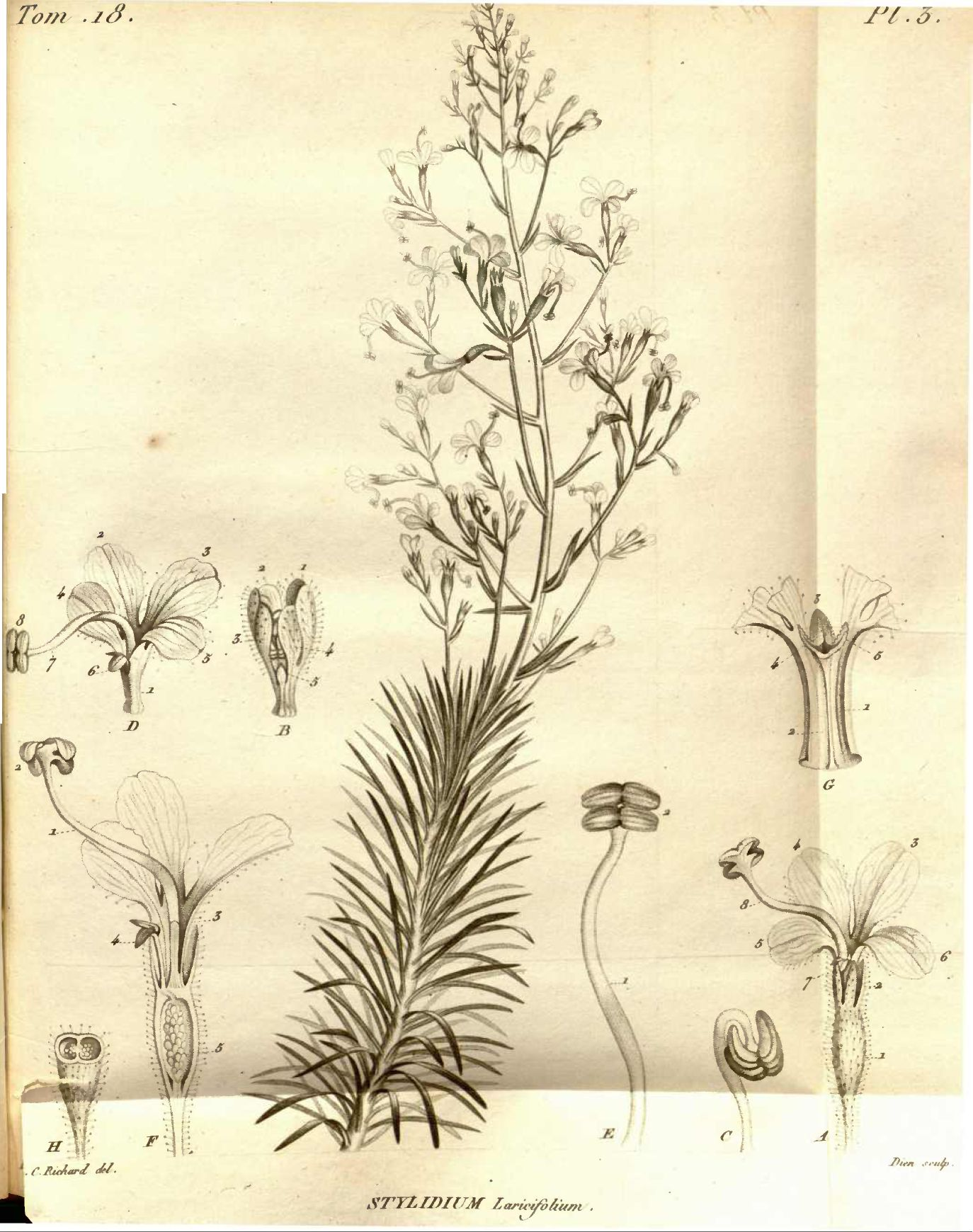
Plate from Annales du Muséum National d'Histoire Naturelle, 1811 Stylidium laricifolium

Richard was born at Versailles. Between 1781 and 1789 he collected botanical specimens in Central America and the West Indies. On his return he became a professor at the École de médecine in Paris.

His books included Demonstrations botaniques (1808), De Orchideis europaeis (1817), Commentatio botanica de Conifereis et Cycadeis (1826) and De Musaceis commentatio botanica (1831).

He gave us the special description terminology for the orchids, such as pollinium and gynostemium.

The genus Richardia Kunth, (Araceae) was named in his honor. It is now a synonym of the genus Zantedeschia. This botanist is denoted by the author abbreviation Rich. when citing a botanical name.

His son was another notable botanist, Achille Richard.

== Eponyms ==
A species of Caribbean lizard, Anolis richardii, is named in honor of Louis Claude Richard. A species of Caribbean snake, Typhlops richardii, is named in honor of either Louis Claude Richard or his son Achille Richard.

== Note ==
Other botanists called Richard are:

- Achille Richard (1794–1852), his son (A.Rich.)
- Jean Michel Claude Richard (1787–1868) (J.M.C.Rich.)
- Olivier Jules Richard (1836–1896) (O.J.Rich.)
- Claude Richard fl. (C.Rich)
- Joseph Herve Pierre Richard (J.H.P.Rich.)
