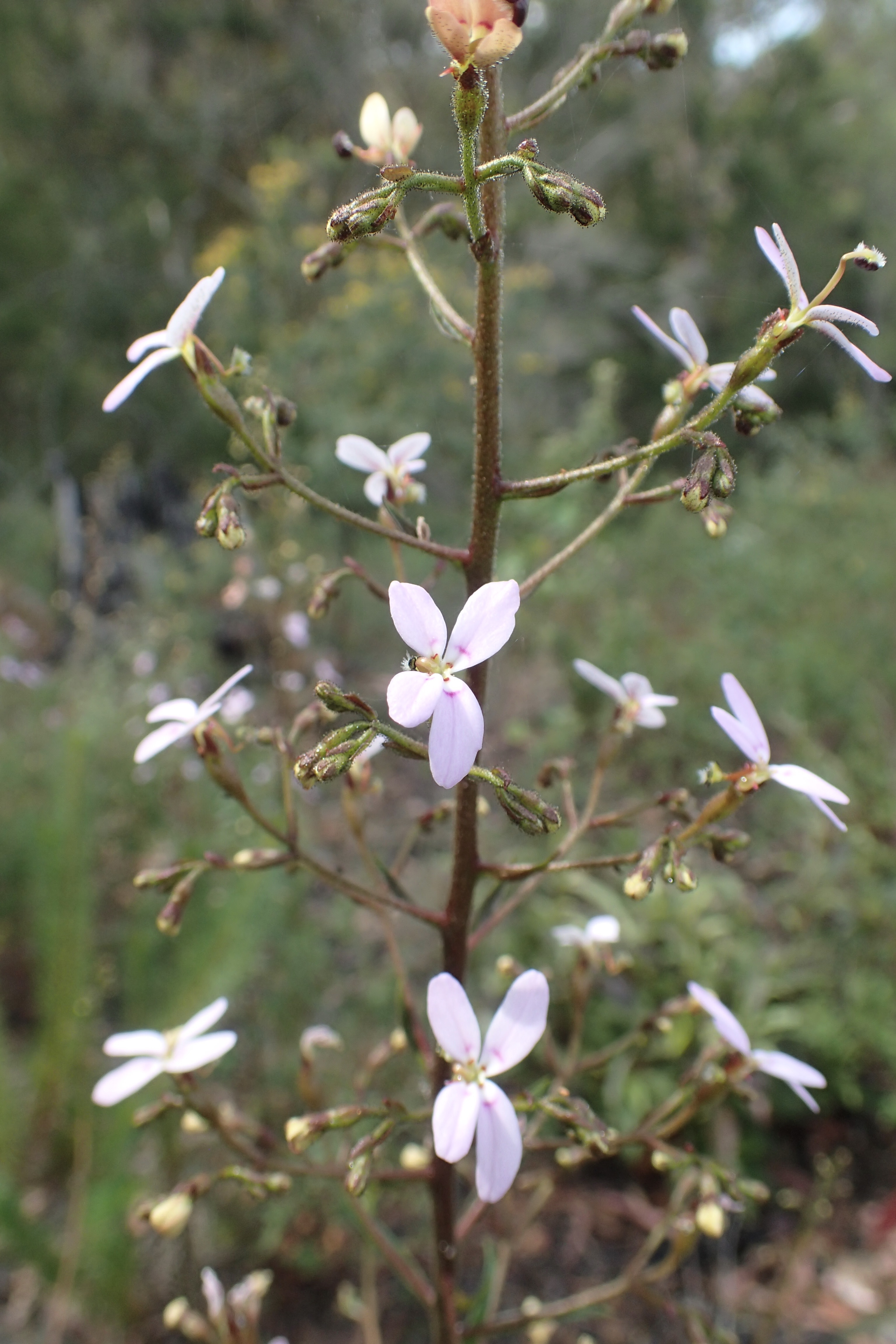
- In the Gibraltar Range National Park

Scientific classification
- Kingdom: Plantae
- Clade: Tracheophytes
- Clade: Angiosperms
- Clade: Eudicots
- Clade: Asterids
- Order: Asterales
- Family: Stylidiaceae
- Genus: Stylidium
- Subgenus: Stylidium subg. Tolypangium
- Section: Stylidium sect. Sparsifoliae
- Species: S. laricifolium

Binomial name
- Stylidium laricifolium Rich.

Synonyms
- Candollea laricifolia (Rich.) F.Muell.; Stylidium tenuifolium R.Br.

= Stylidium laricifolium =

Species of carnivorous plant

Stylidium laricifolium, commonly known as giant trigger-plant, larch-leaf or tree triggerplant, or is a species of flowering plant in the family Stylidiaceae and is endemic to eastern Australia. It is a perennial subshrub with many linear leaves crowded along its few stems, the flowers white to pale pink and arranged in a single main panicle and smaller racemes.

== Description ==
Stylidium laricifolium is a perennial subshrub with few stems, that typically grows to a height of 0.3–1.5 m (1 ft 0 in – 4 ft 11 in). The leaves are linear, 10–80 mm (0.39–3.15 in) long, about 1–2 mm (0.039–0.079 in) wide and crowded along the stems. The flowering stems are 14–45 cm (5.5–17.7 in) high, with between ten and thirty flowers arranged in a single main panicle and several smaller racemes. The sepals are narrow lance-shaped, 1.5–2 mm (0.059–0.079 in) long and joined at the base forming a tube longer than the lobes. The corolla is white to pale pink, about 10–15 mm (0.39–0.59 in) wide with two pairs of oblong petals. The column is 6–7 mm (0.24–0.28 in) long with a cushion-like stigma and the ovary is 3–4 mm (0.12–0.16 in) long and covered with glandular hairs. Flowering occurs from September to December and the fruit is an oblong capsule 8–12 mm (0.31–0.47 in) long.

== Taxonomy ==
Stylidium laricifolium was first formally described in 1806 by Louis Claude Richard in Christiaan Hendrik Persoon's book Synopsis plantarum. The specific epithet laricifolium refers to the long, narrow leaves, which resemble the leaf form of plants in the Larix genus. The type specimen was probably collected during Nicholas Baudin's expedition to Australia, which included a visit to Port Jackson in 1802.

== Distribution and habitat ==
Giant trigger-plant grows in forest in rocky places from south-east Queensland, along the coast and tablelands of New South Wales to eastern Victoria.

== See also ==
- List of Stylidium species
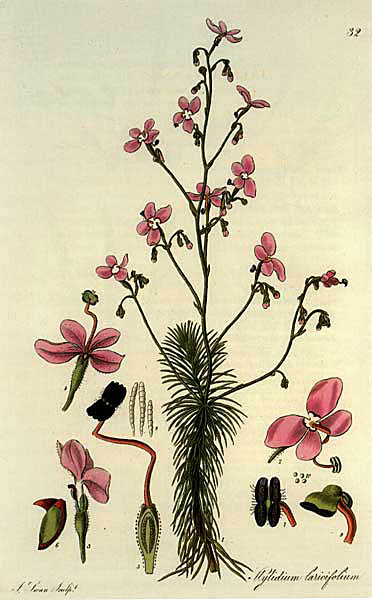
Print from William Jackson Hooker's 1823 Exotic Flora

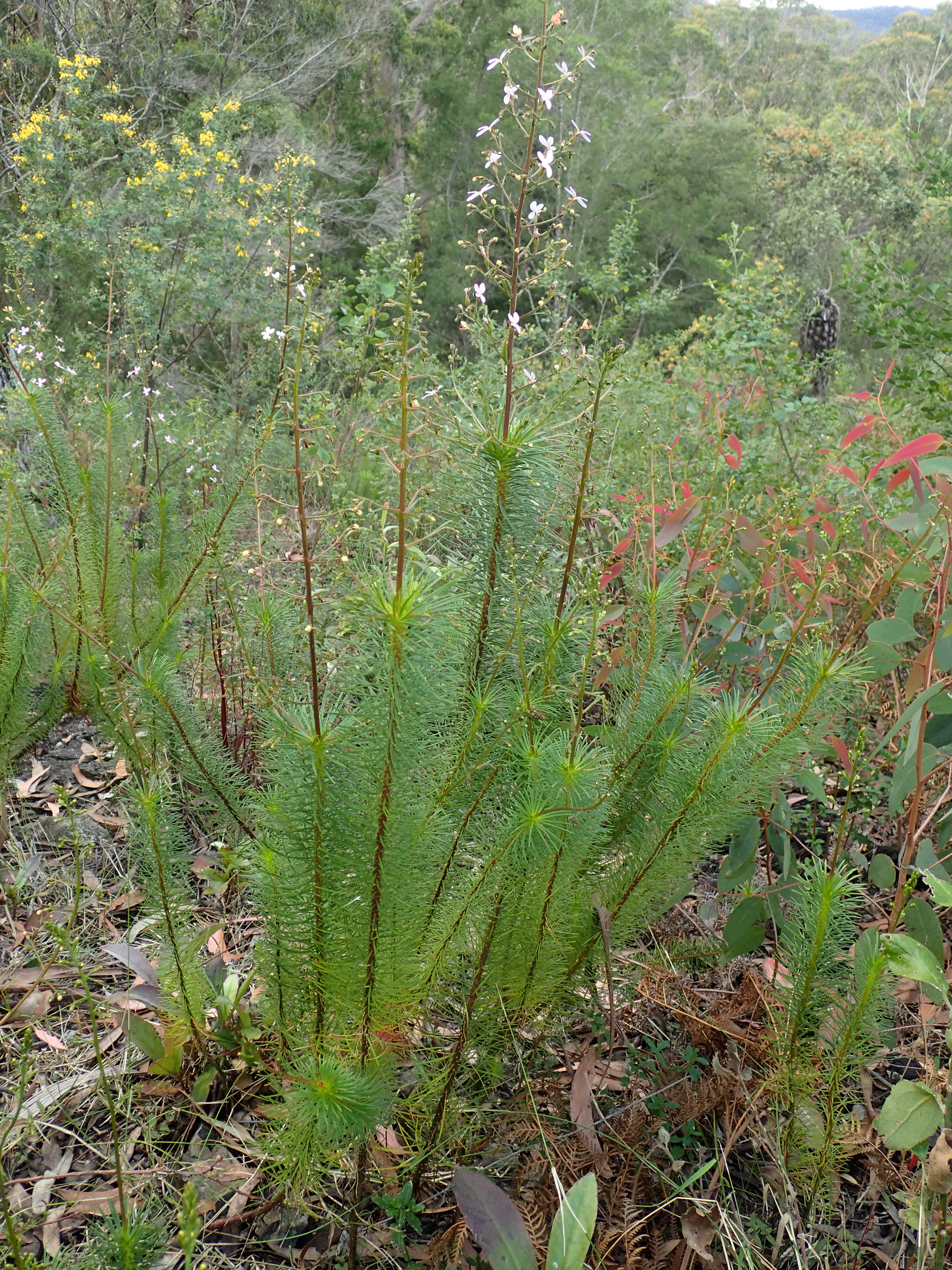
Habit

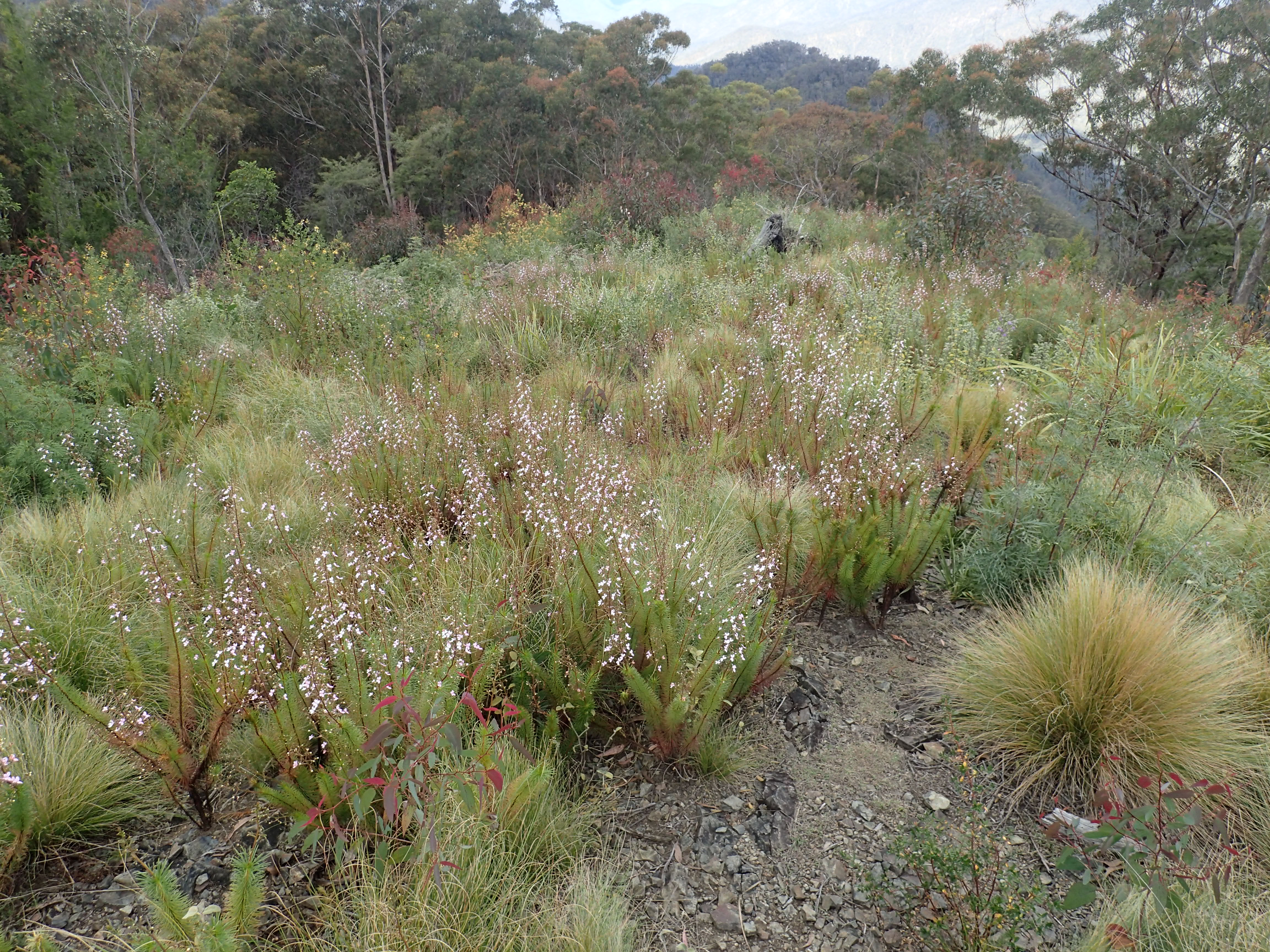
Habitat near Raspberry Lookout in the Gibraltar Range
