= Pristimantis shrevei =

Conservation status
- Endangered (IUCN 3.1)

Scientific classification
- Kingdom: Animalia
- Phylum: Chordata
- Class: Amphibia
- Order: Anura
- Family: Strabomantidae
- Genus: Pristimantis
- Species: P. shrevei

Binomial name
- Pristimantis shrevei (Schwartz, 1967)

Synonyms
- Eleutherodactylus urichi Barbour, 1935; Eleutherodactylus urichi shrevei Schwartz, 1967; Eleutherodactylus shrevei Kaiser, 1994

Species of amphibian

The Saint Vincent frog (Pristimantis shrevei) is a species of frog in the family Strabomantidae. It is endemic to the island of Saint Vincent, in the Lesser Antilles.

== Etymology ==
The specific name, shrevei, is in honor of American herpetologist Benjamin Shreve.

== Distribution and habitat ==
The Saint Vincent frog is endemic to Saint Vincent, an island in the Lesser Antilles and the largest island of Saint Vincent and the Grenadines. Its natural habitats are rainforests forest edge, and montane meadows; it has been recorded as high up as the upper reaches of La Soufrière, at close to 1,200 metres (3,900 ft) above sea level. It has been suggested that the Saint Vincent frogs may have previously had a greater presence in lower-elevation areas, and been displaced from them by the introduction of Eleutherodactylus johnstonei to Saint Vincent.

== Description ==
Albert Schwartz gave the snout-vent length for males as 20.8–23.4 mm (0.82–0.92 in) and for females as 23.5–34.2 mm (0.93–1.35 in). The maximum recorded snout-vent length for a male sits at 29 mm (1.1 in), and the maximum for a female at 40.1 mm (1.58 in). Saint Vincent frogs have a high variability when it comes to colour and patterns, but they generally have a rich wood-brown to rich tan dorsum, a dark interocular bar bordering the snout, streaks or dots of brown on a yellowish throat, red sides and red undersides of both the fore- and hindlimbs. Some individuals are patternless whereas others have a broad dark brown scapular "W", while others have various different patterns. The ventral surface is creamy.

The frog's primary method of calling is clicking, but on occasion it emits a longer, higher pitched call. The frog issues its calls from the leaves of trees and shrubs. At very high elevations, such as those of La Soufrière, the frog's calls have a somewhat lower pitch, theorized to be due to lower body temperatures caused by the colder high-altitude environment.

== Conservation status ==
The Saint Vincent frog is threatened by habitat loss caused by urbanization, tourism development, and agriculture, and is listed as an endangered species.
