= Pristimantis euphronides =

Conservation status
- Critically Endangered (IUCN 3.1)

Scientific classification
- Kingdom: Animalia
- Phylum: Chordata
- Class: Amphibia
- Order: Anura
- Family: Strabomantidae
- Genus: Pristimantis
- Species: P. euphronides

Binomial name
- Pristimantis euphronides (Schwartz, 1967)

Synonyms
- Eleutherodactylus urichi euphronides Schwartz, 1967; Eleutherodactylus euphronides Schwartz, 1967

Species of frog

Pristimantis euphronides is a species of frog in the family Strabomantidae. It is endemic to Grenada, an island in the Lesser Antilles, the Caribbean. Is sometimes known as the Grenada frog. It was originally described as a subspecies of Eleutherodactylus urichi (=Pristimantis urichi), but since 1994 it has been recognized as a full species.

== Description ==
Adult males measure 18–27 mm (0.7–1.1 in) and adult females 19–39 mm (0.7–1.5 in) in snout–vent length. The snout is rounded. The tympanum is distinct. Males have a subgular vocal sac.

Pristimantis euphronides has a dark brown dorsal surface, and a cream-colored ventral surface, with orange tinting on the rear of its thighs. Its lips are mottled, and its upper iris is bronze. A dark supra-tympanic stripe runs from the corner of its eye to its armpit.

Males call around dusk, usually from high perches. Females are usually seen near the ground.

== Distribution and habitat ==
Distribution of Pristimantis euphronides is limited to central and southeast Grenada at elevations between 300 and 840 m (980 and 2,760 ft) above sea level. Its natural habitats are rainforests as well as forest edges and montane meadows surrounded by agriculture. The eggs are deposited on the ground and have direct development (i.e., there is no free-living larval stage).

Pristimantis euphronides is moderately common in suitable habitat, but its range is small. Moreover, it is threatened by habitat loss primarily caused by urbanization and tourism development, but also by agriculture. The invasive Eleutherodactylus johnstonei represents a potential threat. This species is found in the Grand Etang Forest Reserve.
