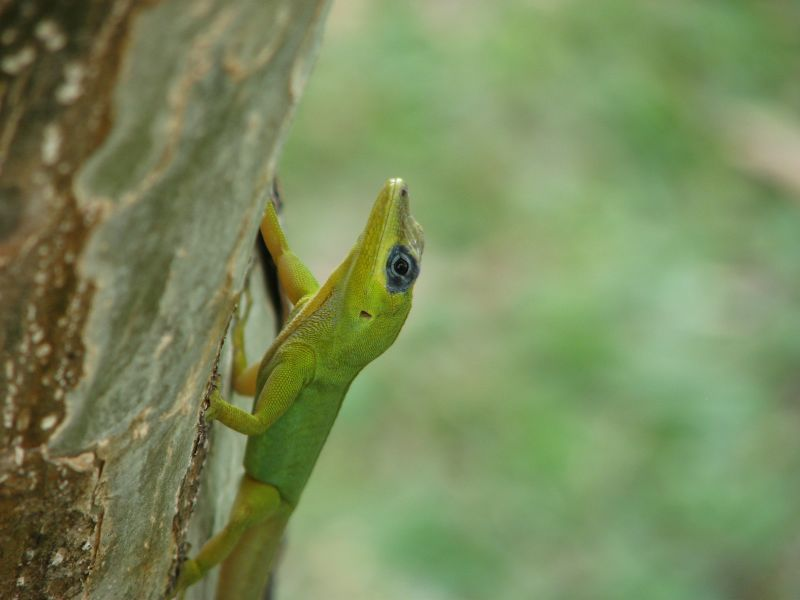

Conservation status
- Least Concern (IUCN 3.1)

Scientific classification
- Kingdom: Animalia
- Phylum: Chordata
- Class: Reptilia
- Order: Squamata
- Suborder: Iguania
- Family: Dactyloidae
- Genus: Anolis
- Species: A. trinitatis

Binomial name
- Anolis trinitatis Reinhardt & Lütken, 1862

Synonyms
- Anolis vincenti – Garman, 1887; Anolis trinitatus – Creer et al., 2001

= Anolis trinitatis =

Species of lizard

Anolis trinitatis, also known as Saint Vincent bush anole, Saint Vincent's bush anole, or the Trinidad anole, is a species of anole lizard found in the Caribbean.

== Geographic range ==
It is endemic to the island of Saint Vincent, and has been introduced to Trinidad.

== Description ==
Males, which reach 74 mm snout-to-vent (about 3 inches), are green to green-blue, with blue stippling on the head and anterior trunk. They have yellow coloring on the jaws and ventral surface, and the area around the eye is dark. Males have a large dewlap that extends into the abdominal region. Females are duller and have a smaller dewlap.

== Behavior ==
It typically perches at low heights, below around 3 m (10 feet).
