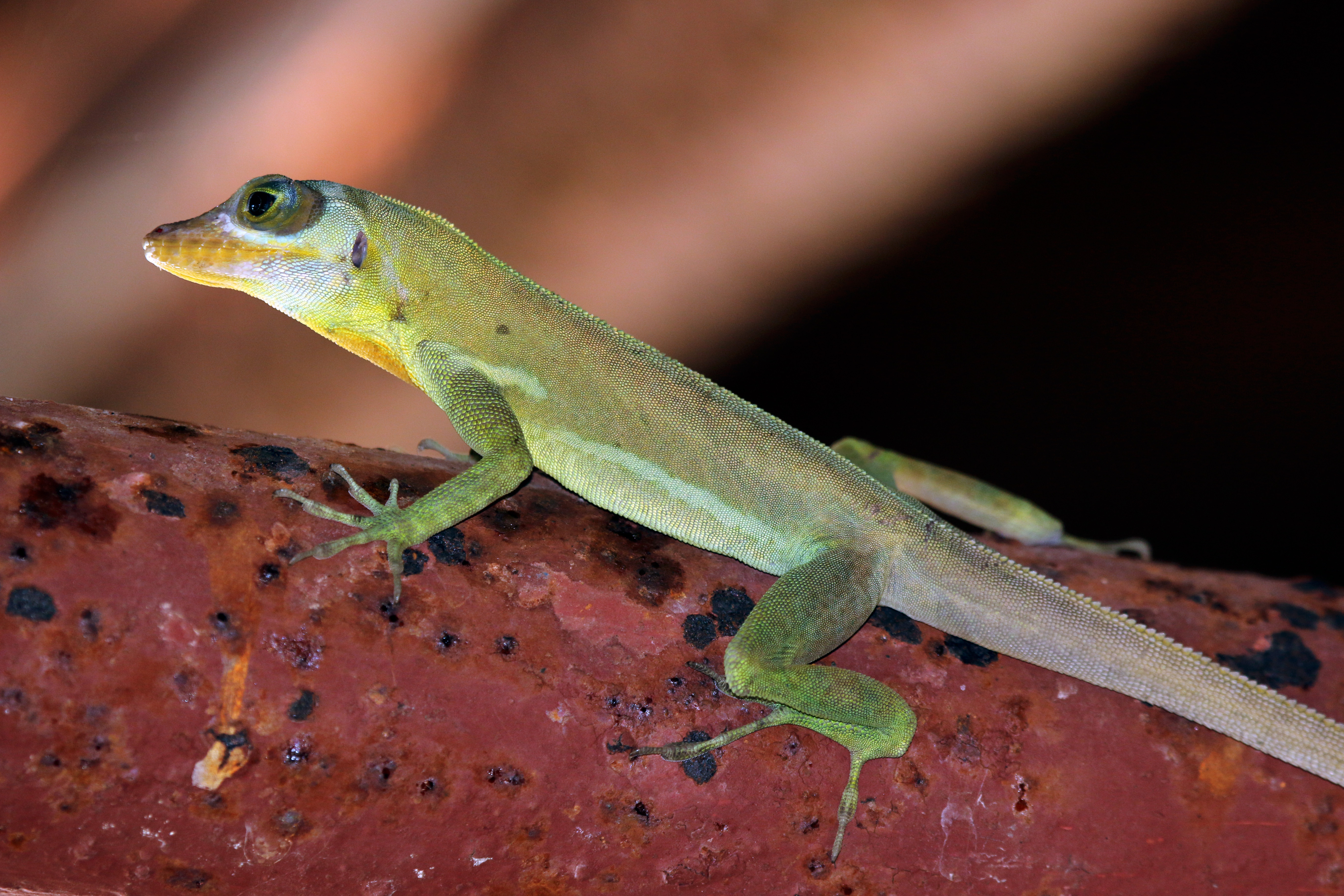
- Richard's anole, Tobago

Conservation status
- Least Concern (IUCN 3.1)

Scientific classification
- Kingdom: Animalia
- Phylum: Chordata
- Class: Reptilia
- Order: Squamata
- Suborder: Iguania
- Family: Dactyloidae
- Genus: Anolis
- Species: A. richardii

Binomial name
- Anolis richardii A.M.C. Duméril & Bibron, 1837

Synonyms
- Anolis Richardii A.M.C. Duméril & Bibron, 1837; Anolis occipitalis Gray, 1840; Anolis stenodactylus Gray, 1840; Ptychonotus (Ctenodeira) richardii — Fitzinger, 1843; Anolis trossulus Garman, 1887; Anolis richardi — Schwartz & Henderson, 1991; Dactyloa richardii — Nicholson et al., 2012

= Anolis richardii =

Grenada tree anole

Species of lizard

Anolis richardii, commonly known as the Grenada tree anole or Richard's anole, is a species of anole lizard in the family Dactyloidae. The species is found in the Caribbean.

== Etymology ==
The specific name, richardii, is in honor of French botanist Louis Claude Marie Richard.

== Geographic range ==
A. richardii is native to Grenada and the Grenadines islands, and it has been introduced to Tobago.

== Description ==
A. richardii is large for an anole, with males reaching a maximum length of 140 mm (5.5 in) snout-to-vent. It has a dark green or brown dorsal surface, with a green-gray to yellow ventral surface. Its dewlap is orange, yellow, or gray-green. Females and juveniles often have a yellow or cream-colored lateral stripe.
