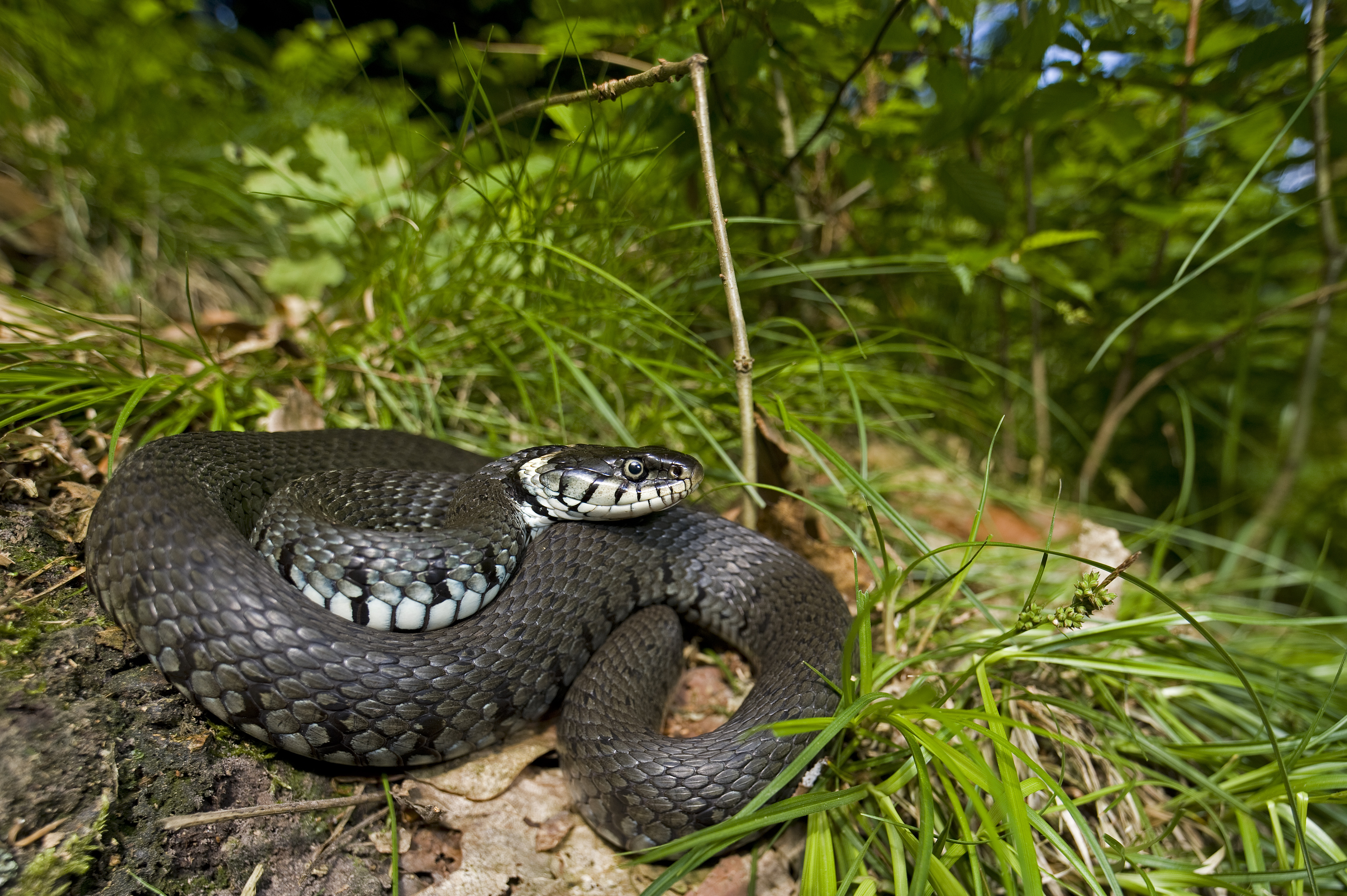

Scientific classification
- Kingdom: Animalia
- Phylum: Chordata
- Class: Reptilia
- Order: Squamata
- Suborder: Serpentes
- Family: Colubridae
- Genus: Natrix
- Species: N. helvetica

Binomial name
- Natrix helvetica (Lacépède, 1789)
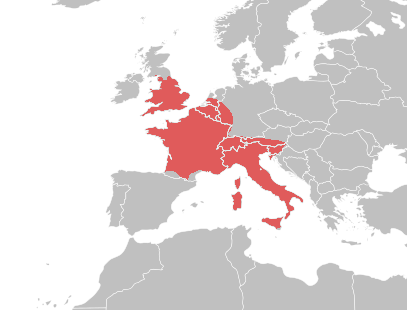

= Barred grass snake =

Species of snake

The barred grass snake (Natrix helvetica) is a non-venomous colubrid snake from Western Europe, typically living in and close to water. It was included within the grass snake species, Natrix natrix, until August 2017, when genetic analysis led to its reclassification as a separate species.

== Subspecies ==
There are currently five subspecies of Natrix helvetica recognized (having been formerly classified as subspecies of N. natrix):

- N. helvetica helvetica (syn. N. natrix helvetica) – most of range
- N. helvetica cetti (syn. N. natrix cetti) – Sardinia
- N. helvetica corsa (syn. N. natrix corsa) – Corsica
- N. helvetica lanzai (syn. N. natrix lanzai) – mainland Italy, but not south
- N. helvetica sicula (syn. N. natrix sicula) – Calabria and Sicily

== Description ==
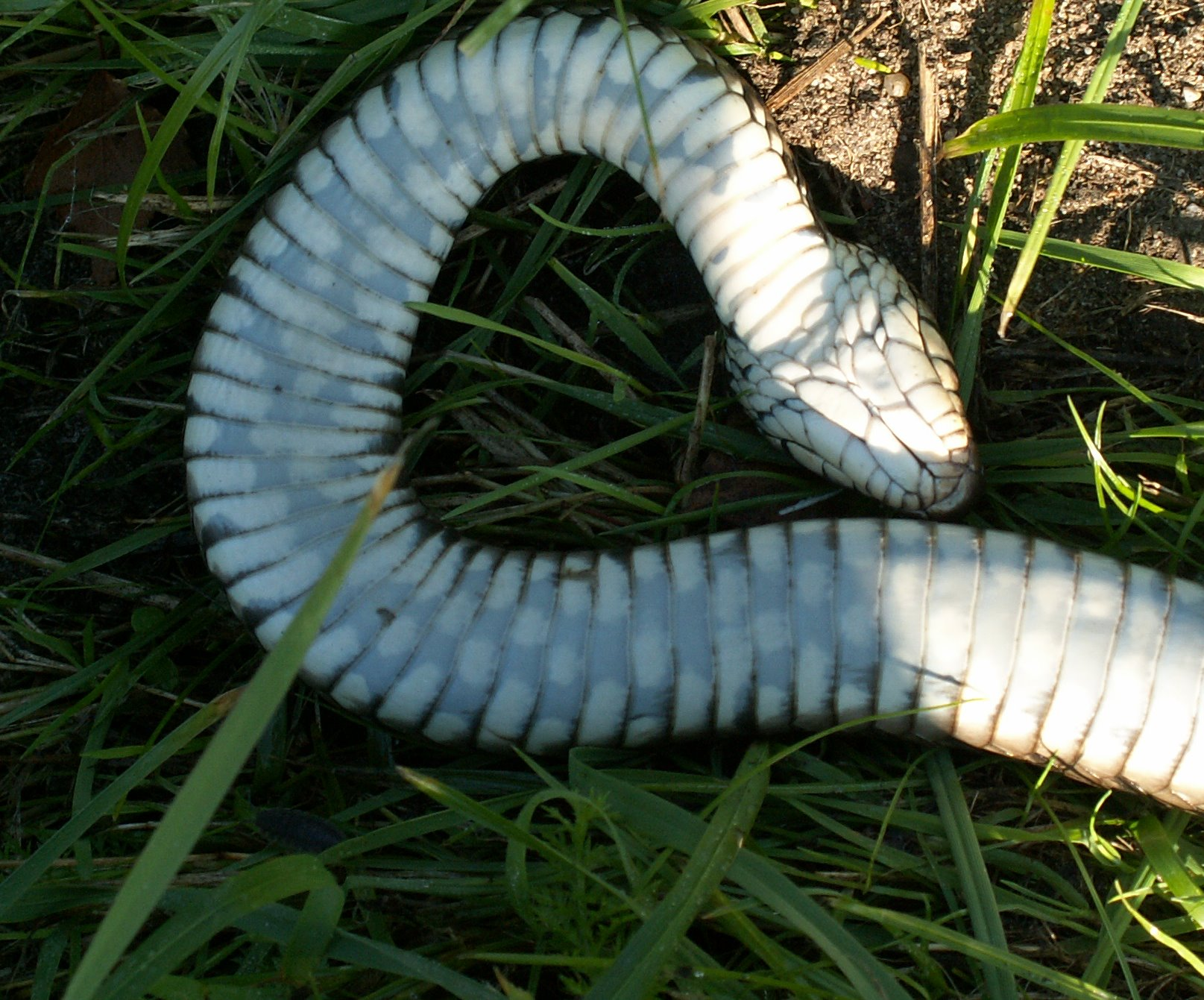
Underside (feigning death)

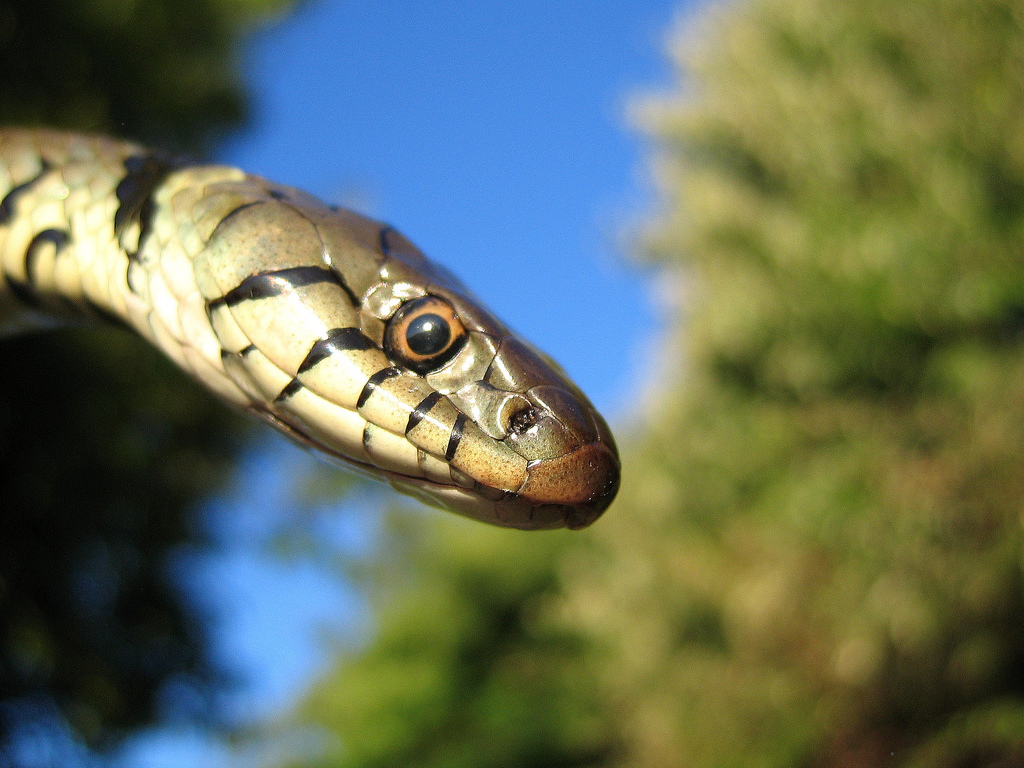
Head showing typical pattern including yellow collar, a feature shared with the grass snake

The barred grass snake has a dark grey-green upper body with distinctive black markings in the form of bars running along its sides. Its underside is pale. Like the grass snake, it has a distinctive yellow and black collar around its neck. It can grow to over a metre in length.

== Distribution ==
The species is found in Great Britain as far north as southern Scotland, and in the Netherlands, western Germany, Switzerland, Italy and France. The nominate subspecies N. h. helvetica has the widest distribution: from Britain to the Pyrenees and the Rhine region.

== Ecology ==
=== Feeding ===
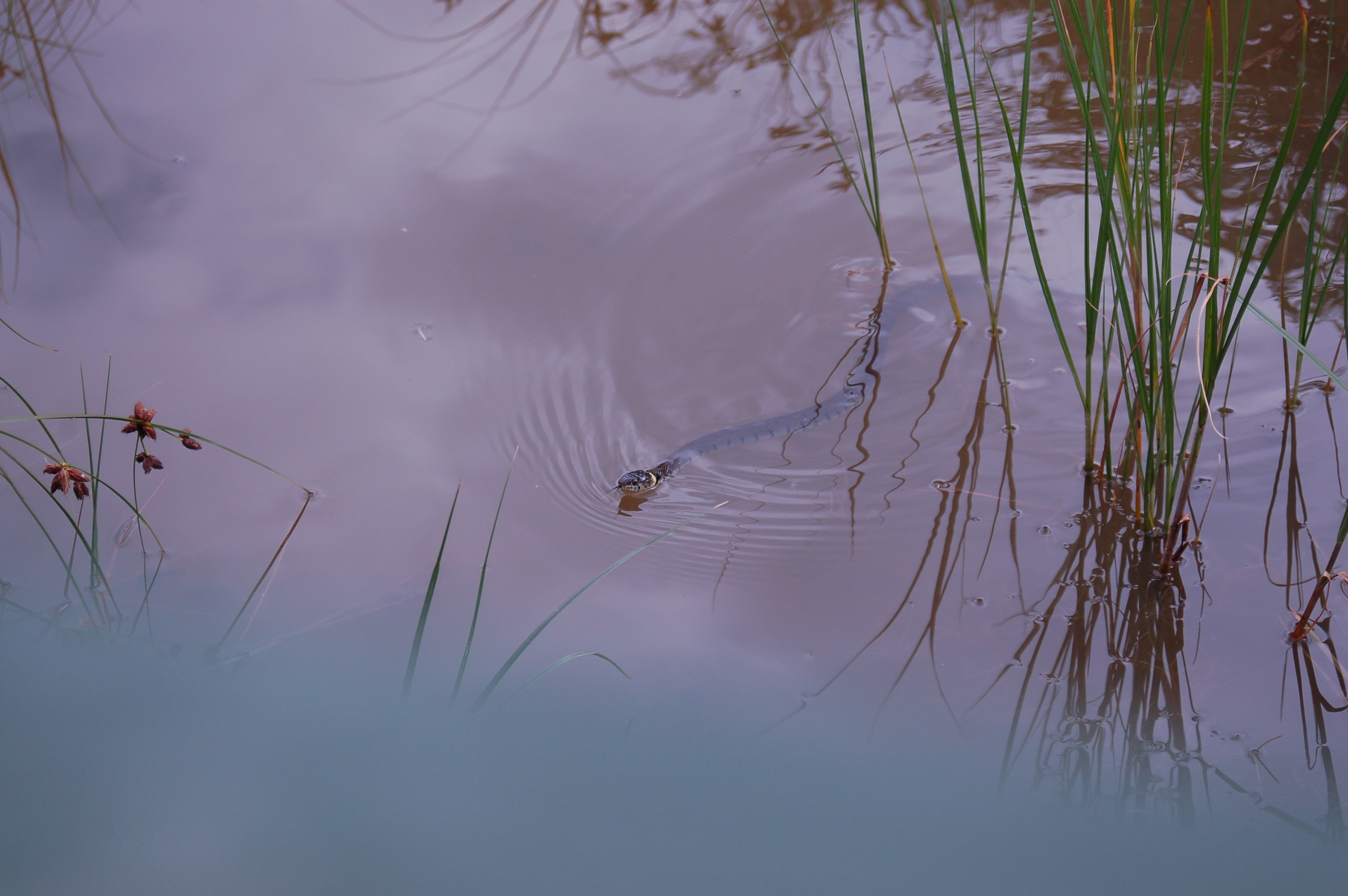
Barred grass snake swimming: they primarily prey on amphibians and are adapted to wet habitats

Barred grass snakes are semi-aquatic and prey mainly on amphibians, especially common toads and common frogs; they also eat fish, some small land mammals and nestling birds, and may occasionally take ants and their larvae. Captive snakes have been observed accepting earthworms offered by hand, but they never take dead prey items. The snake actively searches for prey, often on the edges of the water, using its Jacobson's organ to detect smells and sights. They consume live prey without using constriction.

=== Hibernation ===
Barred grass snakes inhabit cooler climates such as those in northern Europe and Great Britain. They live near bodies of water and spend a significant portion of the year hibernating, typically throughout the coldest months. Hibernation periods can begin as early as October, when temperatures start to drop, and may last until April. They either seek shelter to protect themselves from harsh weather conditions or burrow underground to maintain a stable body temperature during hibernation.

=== Habitat ===
Barred grass snakes are strong swimmers and can be found near freshwater. However, there is evidence that individual snakes do not always require bodies of water throughout the entire season.

The preferred habitat appears to be open woodland and "edge" habitats, such as the edges of fields and woodlands. These areas offer adequate refuge while still affording ample opportunity for thermoregulation through basking. Pond edges are also favoured and the relatively high likelihood of observing this elusive species in such areas may explain why they are associated with ponds and water. Barred grass snakes also inhabit gardens and parks in their native range, as well as dry grasslands.

Like most reptiles, barred grass snakes are at the mercy of the thermal environment and need to overwinter in areas that do not freeze. They typically spend the winter underground, where the temperature is relatively stable.

=== Reproduction ===
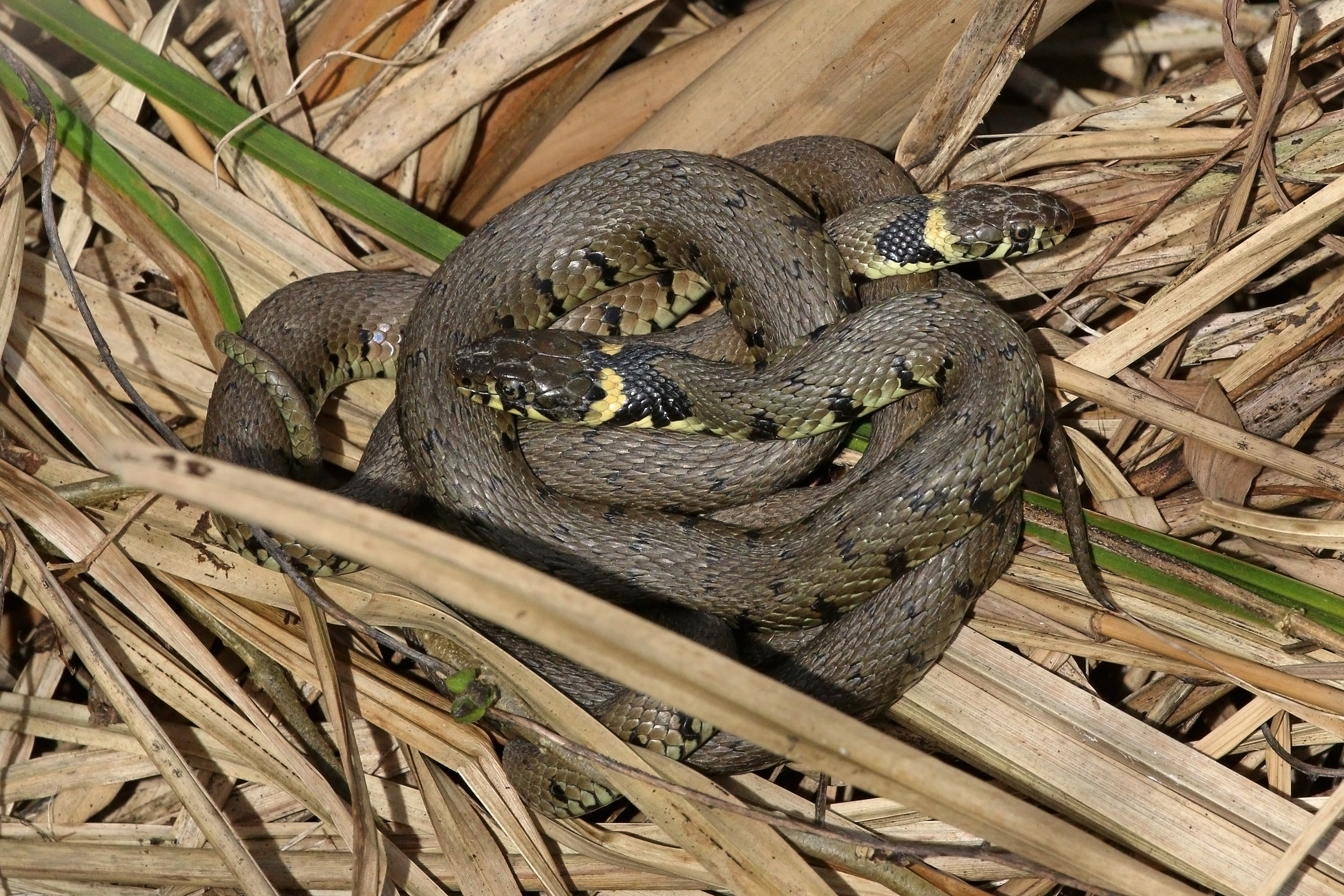
Mating coil (Oxfordshire, England)

Eggs

As spring approaches, the males emerge first and spend much of the day basking in an effort to raise their body temperature and increase their metabolism. This may be a tactic to maximise sperm production, as the males mate with the females as soon as they emerge up to two weeks later in April, or earlier if environmental temperatures are favourable. The leathery eggs are laid in batches of eight to 40 between June and July, and hatch after around 10 weeks. In order to survive and hatch, the eggs require a temperature of at least 21 °C (70 °F), but preferably 28 °C (82 °F), with high humidity. Areas of rotting vegetation, such as compost heaps, are preferred locations. The young measure about 18 centimetres (7 in) in length when they hatch and are immediately independent.

=== Migration ===
After breeding in the summer, barred grass snakes tend to hunt and may travel long distances during this time, moving up to several hundred metres in a day. Their prey tends to be large relative to the size of the snake, which impairs their mobility. Snakes that have recently eaten rarely move any significant distance; instead, they stay in one location and bask to optimise their body temperature until the prey item has been digested. Individual snakes may only require two or three significant prey items throughout an entire season.

=== Ecdysis (moulting) ===
Ecdysis occurs at least once during the active season. As the outer skin wears and the snake grows, the new skin forms underneath the old, including the eye scales, which may turn milky blue or white at this time – and are referred to as being 'in blue'. This colour comes from an oily secretion between the old and new skins, and the snake's colour will also appear dull, as though the animal is dusty. This process affects the snake's eyesight and it does not move or hunt during this time. It is also more irritable, as are most other snakes. Eventually, the outer skin sloughs off in one piece (inside out) and the snake resumes normal activity.

=== Defence ===
In defence they can produce a garlic-smelling fluid from their anal glands and feign death (thanatosis) by becoming completely limp when they may also secrete blood (autohaemorrhage) from the mouth and nose. They may also perform an aggressive display in defence, hissing and striking without opening their mouths. They rarely bite in defence. When caught they often regurgitate the contents of their stomachs.

Barred grass snakes display a rare defensive behaviour involving raising the front of their bodies and flattening their heads and necks so that they resemble cobra's hoods. However, the geographic ranges of grass snakes and of cobras overlap very little. However, the fossil record shows that the extinct European cobra Naja romani occurs in Miocene-aged strata in France, Germany, Austria, Romania, and Ukraine, and thus overlapped with Natrix species including the extinct Natrix longivertebrata. This suggests that the grass snake's behavioural mimicry of cobras is a fossil behaviour, although it may also protect against predatory birds that migrate to Africa for the winter and encounter cobras there. However, such behaviour is not reported for the species in Britain.

Another form of defensive mimicry demonstrated by barred grass snakes is the triangular shape of their heads. Venomous snakes typically have more triangular heads, whereas the heads of nonvenomous snakes tend to be more rounded. However, barred grass snakes can triangulate their heads as a defence mechanism, tricking potential predators into believing that they are venomous and capable of fighting back. This technique is effective because the grass snake shares its habitat with several species of venomous snake, including Vipera aspis and Vipera berus.

=== Protection and threats ===
The species has various predator species, including corvids, storks, owls, raptors, common pheasant, foxes, and domestic cat.

In Great Britain, they are protected under the Wildlife and Countryside Act 1981. It is illegal to kill, harm, take from the wild, keep in captivity or trade them without a valid licence.

Before its reclassification in 2007, the grass snake was included on the updated UK Biodiversity Action Plan as a species in need of conservation and greater protection.
