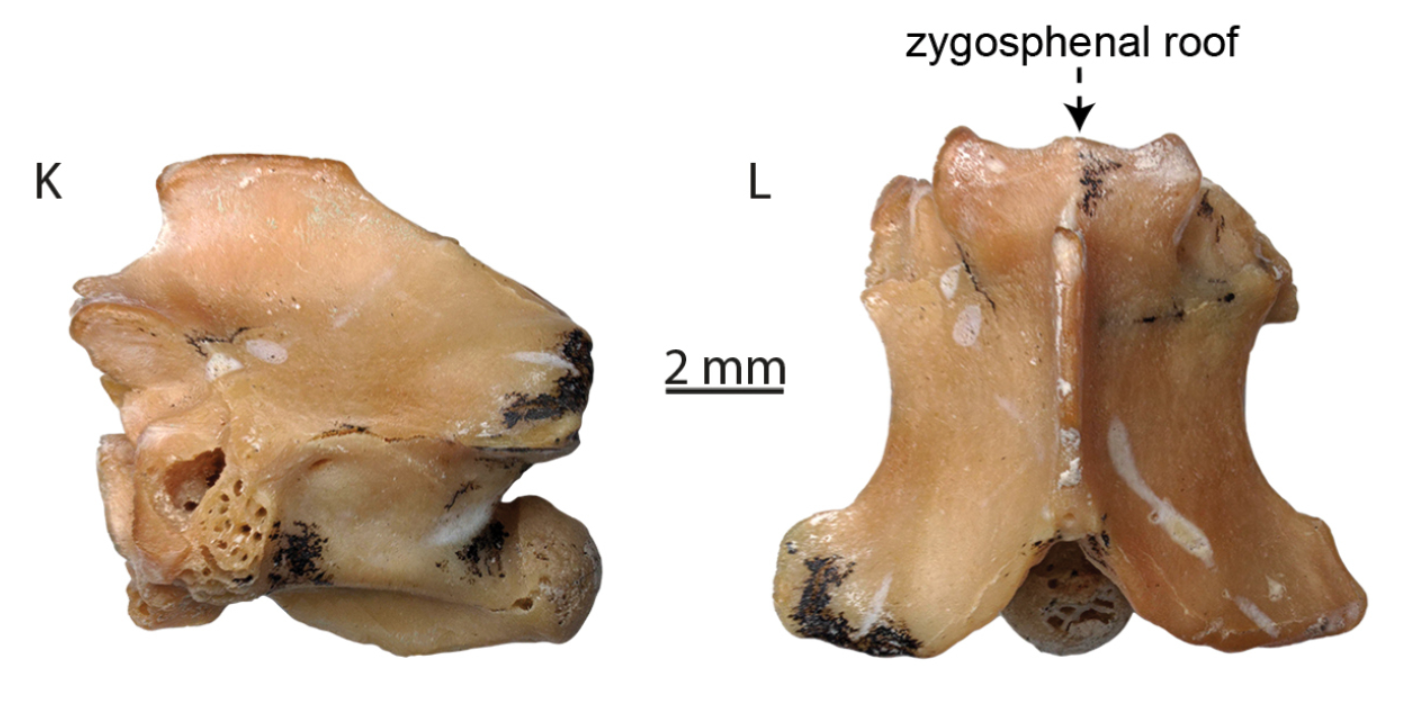
- Vertebrae of Naja cf. romani from Echzell, Germany

Scientific classification
- Kingdom: Animalia
- Phylum: Chordata
- Class: Reptilia
- Order: Squamata
- Suborder: Serpentes
- Family: Elapidae
- Genus: Naja
- Species: N. romani

Binomial name
- Naja romani (Hofstetter, 1939)

Synonyms
- Naja austriaca Bachmayer & Szyndlar, 1985; Palaeonaja crassa Hofstetter, 1939; Palaeonaja romani Hofstetter, 1939

= Naja romani =

Naja romani Temporal range: Miocene 16.9–5.3 Ma

Extinct species of cobra

Naja romani is an extinct species of cobra from the Miocene of Europe. Its remains have been found from France to Russia and suggest a continued growth to larger sizes throughout its range in time. While successful during the early and middle stages of the Miocene, the species disappeared from the fossil record of Central Europe during the late Miocene with the last known specimen being recovered from a site in the modern Caucasus, inferred to have been a refuge for reptiles. Estimates suggest that Naja romani may have reached a length of over 2 m (6 ft 7 in).

== History and naming ==
Naja romani was first described by Hofstetter in the year 1939 on the basis of several cranial and postcranial remains from La Grive-Saint Alban in France. Hofstetter coined the name Palaeonaja romani as well as Palaeonaja crassa. Later Szyndlar & Rage sunk Palaeonaja into the extant Naja while determining that P. crassa does not differ significantly enough to be considered a distinct species. Additional instances of Naja romani were later reported from various localities across Europe. Fossils from Austria had previously been considered to be their own species, Naja austriaca, but were later deemed to be indistinguishable from those of Naja romani. The most recent find assigned to the species was collected in 2009 in the Caucasus and formed the youngest record of Naja romani.

The species was named in honor of French geologist Frédéric Roman.

== Description ==
The type specimen of Naja romani was determined to have reached a length of 1.80 m (5 ft 11 in) by Hoffstetter. Hoffstetter also estimated a length of over 2 m (6 ft 7 in) for the larger remains he named Naja crassa, which were later found to also belong to Naja romani. An even greater size is indicated by the youngest remains assigned to the species, however no precise estimates are given.

== Classification ==
Within Naja two distinct lineages can be observed, an Asian lineage as well as an African lineage (which is further divided into Afronaja, Boulengerina and Uraeus). Both groups can be distinguished by the anatomy of the basisphenoid, which is distinctly narrower before the basipterygoid crest, has shorter vidian canals and anterior orifices on the ventral rather than the dorsal surface. These characteristics are shared by Naja romani, clearly placing it in the Asian branch of the genus. A second character that would allow assignment to one of the two branches would be the location of the vestibular window. However this is only possible in the French specimens, which support the identification of Naja romani as a member of the Asian lineage. Szyndlar and Zerova conclude that the species was likely an early member of the Asian group, but certainly diverged from the other species after the Asian-African split.

== Range and extinction ==
Localities that yielded Naja romani fossils

The oldest recorded specimens of Naja romani date to the Burdigalian (MN 4) and were discovered in Petersbuch, Germany, with similarly aged remains tentatively referred to the taxon also being found in Echzell (Germany, MN 4) and Vieux-Collonges (France, MN 4/5). By the middle and late Miocene Naja romani could also be found in Grund (Austria, MN 5), La Grive-Saint Alban (France, MN 7+8), Gritsev and Rudabánya (Ukraine and Hungary, MN 9), Ravin de la Pluie (Greece, MN 10) and Kohfidisch (Austria, MN11). Ongoing climate change however likely lead to the extinction of cobras in central Europe by the latest Miocene, with the specimens from Kohfidisch being the last known remains of the species from the region. Cobras did however manage to survive in other regions of Europe and the last known records of Naja romani were found in Solnechnodolsk in the northern Caucasus in strata dating to the late Turolian (MN 13). Notably however, despite being known to preserve a rich and diverse reptile fauna, only a single bone of Naja romani is known from the region, indicating that the species was already declining in this part of the world as well.

This pattern of distribution and disappearance matches the climatic changes that occurred in Europe during the Miocene around the same time as the Messinian Salinity Crisis. Although temperatures remained favorable during the latest stages of the Miocene, the snake fauna of the continent is known to have experienced a loss of diversity. In central Europe in particular temperatures began to drop during the Middle Miocene, causing the formation of distinct climate zones faced with regional extinctions that restricted certain snakes to the warmer regions of western Europe (France and Spain) and southern Europe (Greece and Turkey). The locality in Solnechnodolsk was likely a refugium not just for Naja romani but also for other species of reptiles that had gone extinct elsewhere in Europe. Younger remains of cobras, which are known from the Pliocene of Spain, have been shown to be unrelated to Naja romani and instead are thought to be members of the African-lineage that likely entered Europe following the drying of the Mediterranean.

It has been suggested by Syromyatnikova, Tesakov & Titov that Naja romani grew larger as the Miocene progressed, with specimens from Petersbuch and Vieux-Collonges being generally smaller than younger fossils, which reached their greatest size with those found in Kohfidisch and Solnechnodolski. The exact ecology of Naja romani is not known, though the species is thought to be thermophilous like most other Asian Naja species with the exception of the Caspian cobra. Based on the presence of Naja romani as well as that of monitor lizards, a mean annual temperature of 15°C or more is estimated for the Solnechnodosk locality, suggesting subtropical conditions.

== Possible influence on grass snake behavior ==
In a 2017 publication, Pokrant and colleagues note that in rare cases, modern grass snakes and Iberian grass snakes display defensive behavior similar to that of cobras, raising their upper body and flattening it in a way that resembles a cobra's hood. They note that this behavior is not found in other European snakes while further pointing to the fact that there is no significant overlap in grass snake and cobra ranges. The only areas where the two coexist in the modern day are small regions in Tunisia and east of the Caspian Sea in Iran and Turkmenistan. Pokrant and his team argue that this form of mimicry could have developed during the Neogene when Natrix longivertebrata, thought to be the direct ancestor to both modern grass snake species, coexisted in multiple localities with Naja romani and may have imitated the cobra to scare off predators. As this form of mimicry is only effective when the predator is aware of the model species, rearing behavior would have become increasingly ineffective following the extinction of cobras in Central Europe. Pokrant and colleagues argue that the rareness of rearing behavior in grass snakes might indicate that the species are currently in the process of losing this behavior, though it may still be effective against migratory birds that encounter cobras on their travels.
