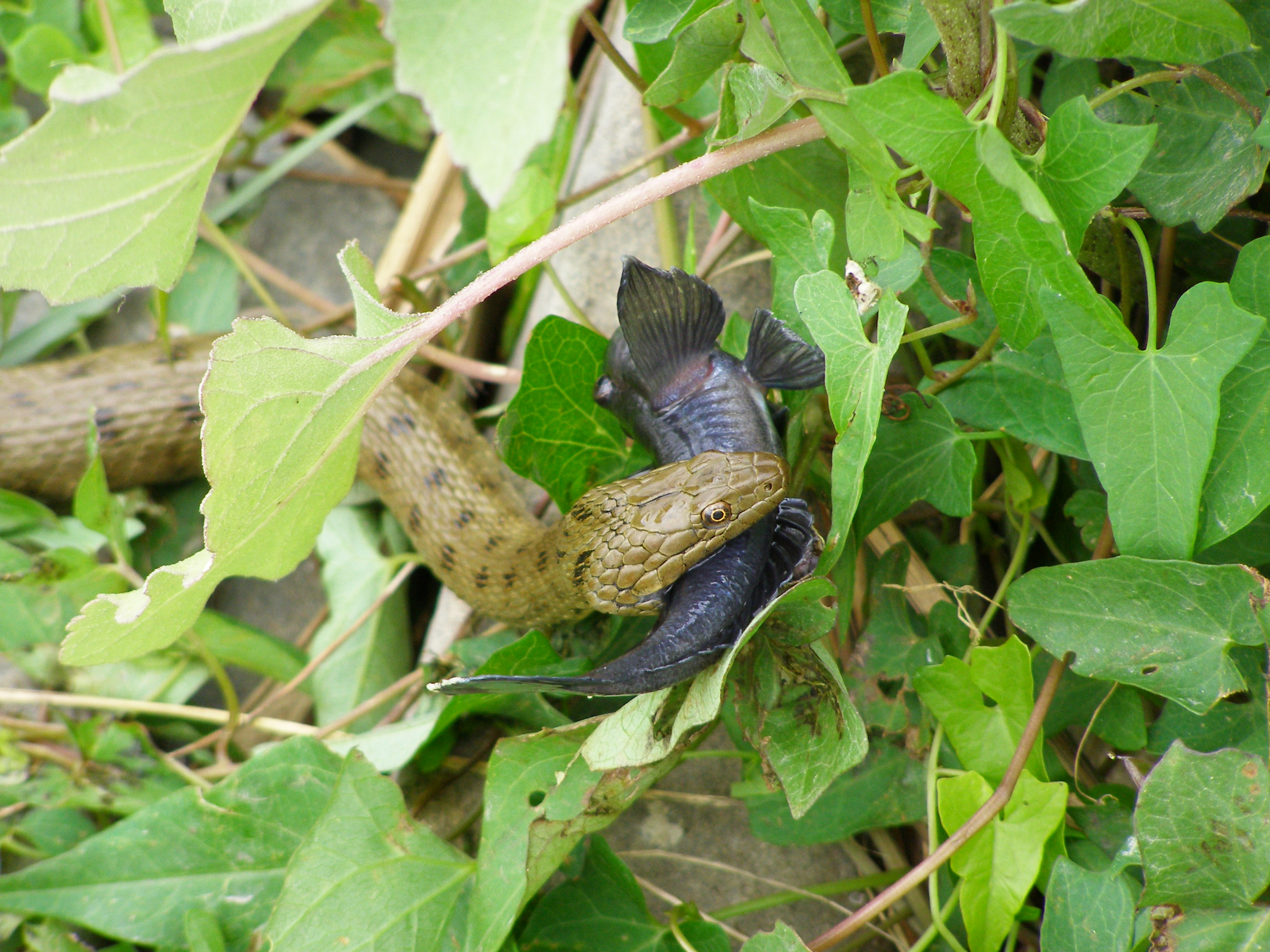
- Eating a goby

Conservation status
- Least Concern (IUCN 3.1)

Scientific classification
- Kingdom: Animalia
- Phylum: Chordata
- Class: Reptilia
- Order: Squamata
- Suborder: Serpentes
- Family: Colubridae
- Genus: Natrix
- Species: N. tessellata

Binomial name
- Natrix tessellata (Laurenti, 1768)
- Distribution of Natrix tessellata

Synonyms
- Coronella tessellata Laurenti, 1768; Coluber tessellatus Bonnaterre, 1790; Tropidonotus tessellatus, part., Wagler, 1830; Natrix tessellata Bonaparte, 1834; Tropidonotus tessellatus Boulenger, 1893

= Dice snake =

Species of snake

The dice snake (Natrix tessellata) or water snake is a Eurasian nonvenomous snake in the family Colubridae, subfamily Natricinae. Its average length is 1.0–1.3 m (39–51 in). Body color may vary from greyish green to brownish or almost black, with dark spots on the back. The belly is sometimes vividly coloured in yellow or orange, with black spots, very similar to dice, hence the name.

== Ecology ==
Living mainly near rivers, streams and lakes, it frequently feeds on fish. Sometimes, it feeds also on amphibians such as frogs, toads, and tadpoles. In one instance, a dice snake was even observed trying to feed on an olm (Proteus anguinus) that had been flushed from a cave in Bosnia and Herzegovina following heavy rains. However, the snake was far too small to be able to consume the olm.

While considered nonvenomous, N. tessellata produces a potent antihemorrhagin in its serum. As a defence, it spreads a very bad-smelling secretion from its cloaca. Another defence mechanism is thanatosis, playing dead.

During the mating season (March–May), they congregate in large groups. Egg-laying is usually in July, and one clutch consists of 10–30 eggs. The young snakes hatch in early September. Dice snakes hibernate from October to April in dry holes near the water.

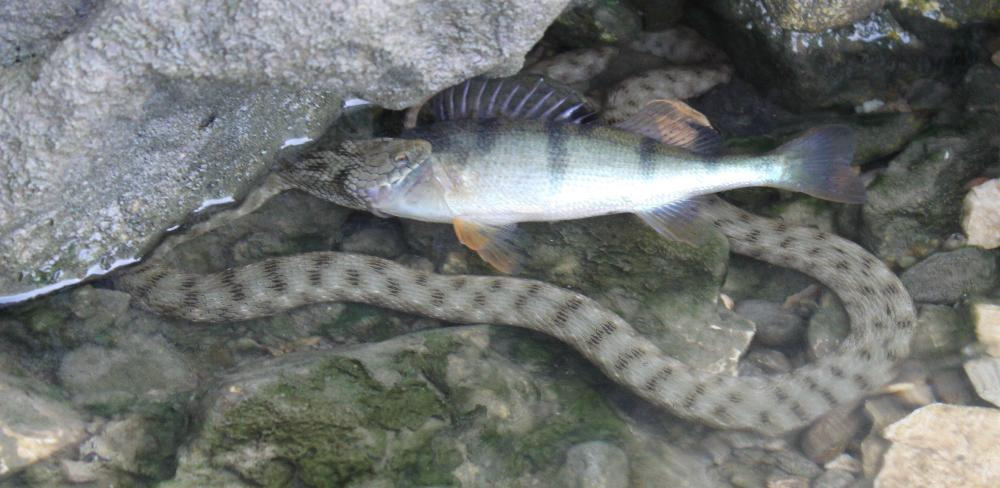
Eating a European perch

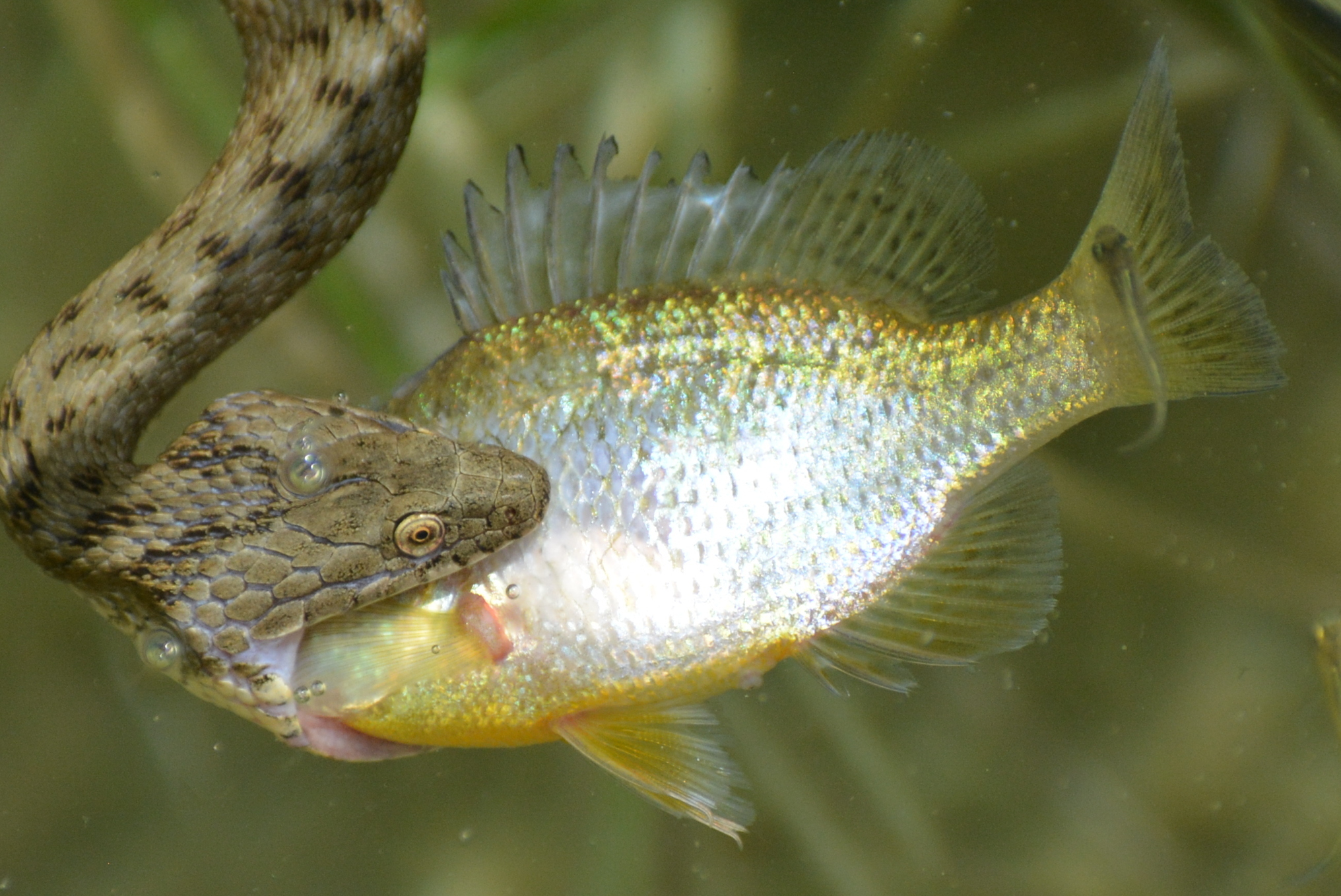
Eating a young pumpkinseed sunfish

== Distribution ==
The dice snake is found throughout much of central and eastern Eurasia, from Italy and Czechia in the west to Kyrgyzstan in the east, and from Ukraine in the north to Iran in the south.

== Conservation ==
The species is considered to be of Least Concern in its overall range, although local populations may be more sensitive. For example, it is considered Critically Endangered in the Czech Republic, mostly due to destruction of habitats and the introduction of invasive American mink.

== Gallery ==
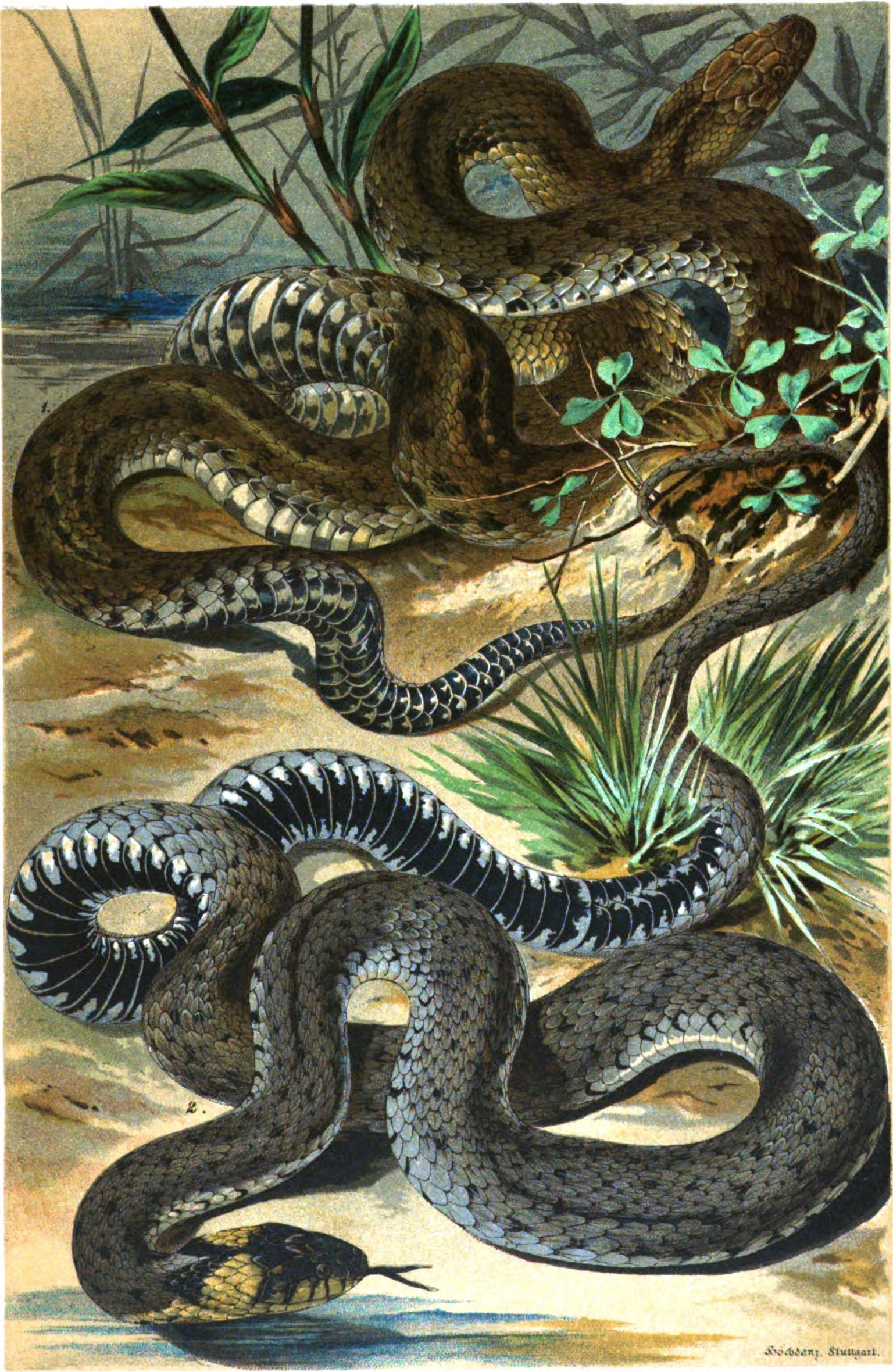
Illustration of dice snake (top) and grass snake (Natrix natrix) including underside

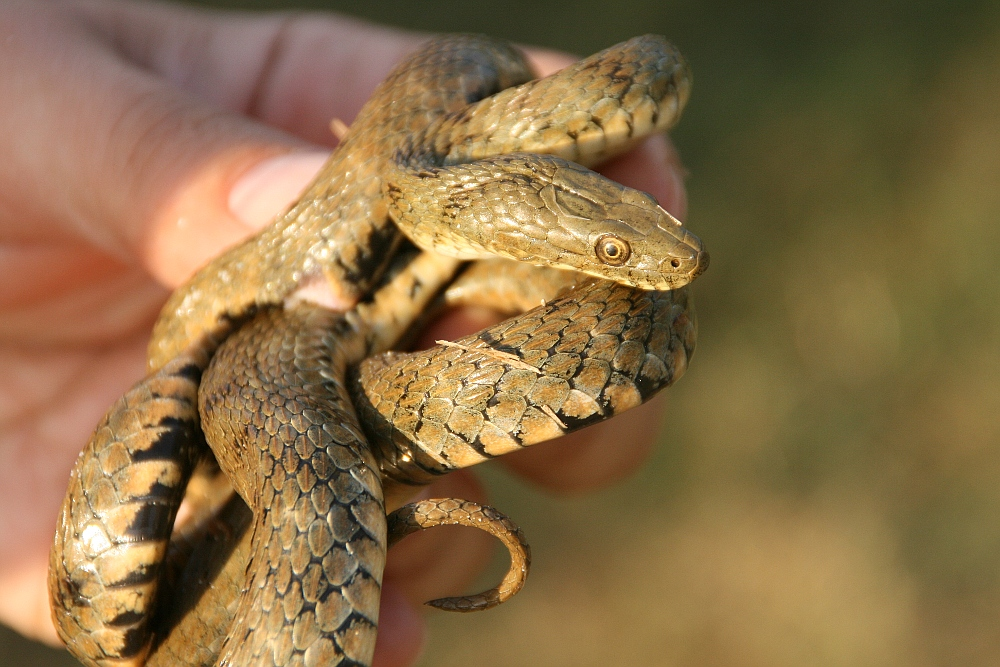
In Umbria, Italy
