= Cyprus grass snake =

Scientific classification
- Domain: Eukaryota
- Kingdom: Animalia
- Phylum: Chordata
- Class: Reptilia
- Order: Squamata
- Suborder: Serpentes
- Family: Colubridae
- Genus: Natrix
- Species: N. natrix
- Subspecies: N. n. cypriaca

Trinomial name
- Natrix natrix cypriaca (Hecht, 1930)

Synonyms
- Tropidonotus natrix cypriacus Hecht, 1930

Subspecies of snake

The Cyprus grass snake (Natrix natrix cypriaca) is an endangered subspecies of the grass snake (Natrix natrix) endemic to the island of Cyprus.
