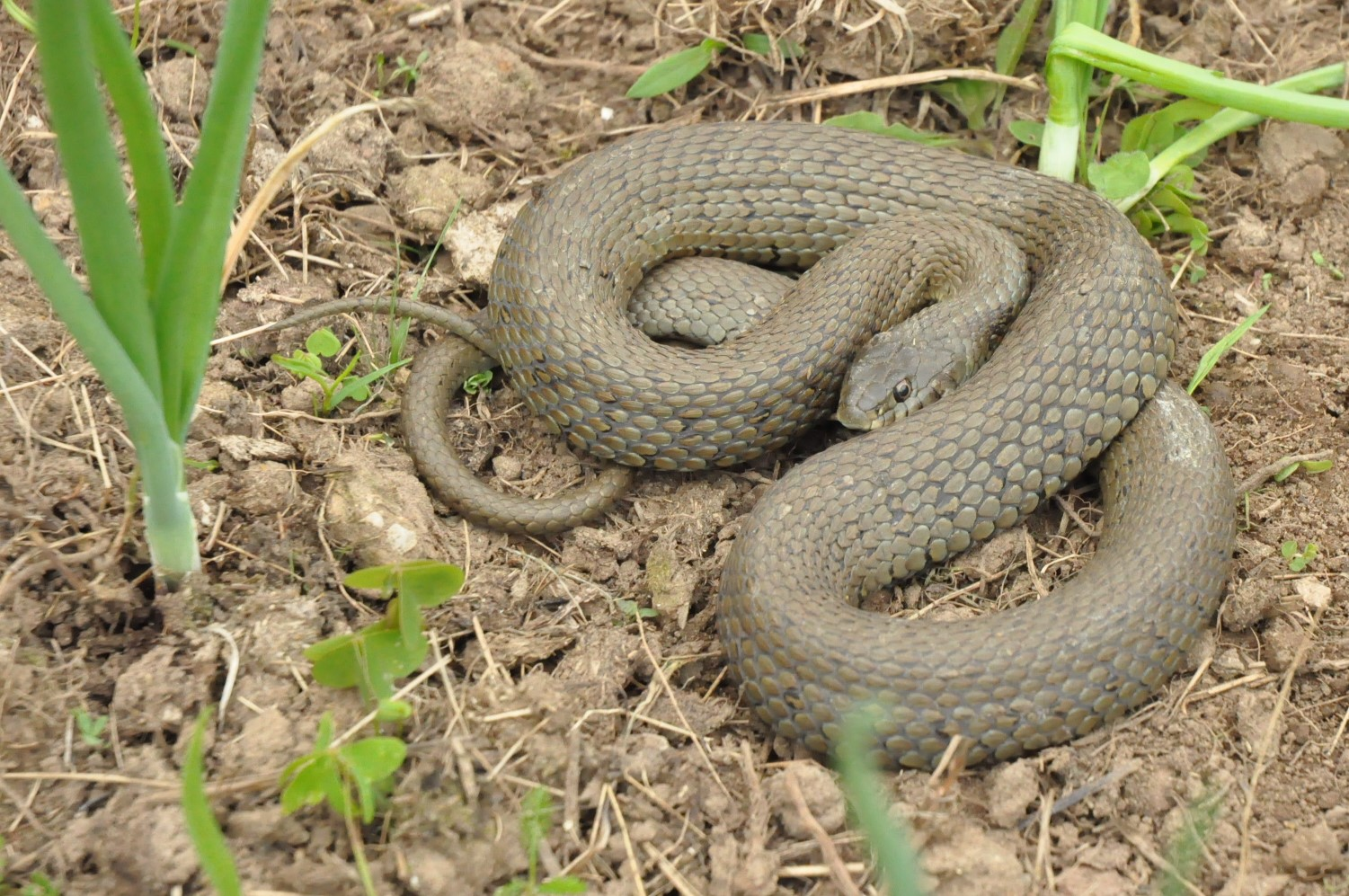

Conservation status
- Least Concern (IUCN 3.1)

Scientific classification
- Kingdom: Animalia
- Phylum: Chordata
- Class: Reptilia
- Order: Squamata
- Suborder: Serpentes
- Family: Colubridae
- Genus: Natrix
- Species: N. astreptophora

Binomial name
- Natrix astreptophora (Seoane, 1885)
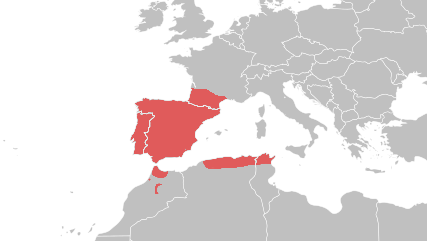

= Natrix astreptophora =

Species of snake

Natrix astreptophora, the red-eyed grass snake or the Iberian grass snake, is a species of natricine snake found in the Iberian Peninsula, south of France, and some coastal areas in the Maghreb, from Tangier to Tunisia. Long considered a subspecies of the European grass snake, Natrix natrix, the subspecies was split off from that taxon in 2016.

== Taxonomy ==
The red-eyed grass snake was formally described by the Spanish herpetologist Victor Lopez Seoane in 1903 as Natrix astreptophora based on specimens from Galicia, Spain (later restricted to A Coruña). The species was subsequently treated as a subspecies in the grass snake complex (Natrix natrix sensu lato). The North African populations of the red-eyed grass snake were described as a separate subspecies of the grass snake, Tropidonotus natrix algericus, by the German herpetologist Günther Hecht in 1930. The taxonomy of the grass snake complex remained unsettled throughout the 20th century, with various authors recognizing anywhere from four to fourteen subspecies in the complex. A 2012 study of genetic data, morphology, and bone characteristics found the red-eyed grass snake to hybridize only very rarely with the barred grass snake (Natrix natrix helvetica) where their ranges met in southern France, and recommended raising it to full species status. Subsequent genetic studies supported this arrangement, and also raised the barred grass snake to full species status.

The 2012 study also found the Tunisian populations of the red-eyed grass snake to be highly distinct from the Iberian population. A subsequent study into the genetic differences between populations of the species found three well-supported clades: the Iberian population, the Moroccan population, and the Tunisian and Algerian population. The Iberian population split from the North African clade around 5.44 million years ago, while the two North African populations split from each other around 4.64 million years ago. These dates correspond to the Messinian Salinity Crisis and the reflooding of the Mediterranean, which are probable triggers for the radiation of these clades. The subspecies algerica was then resurrected for the North African populations to reflect their genetic divergence from the nominate Iberian subspecies.

Fossils of the red-eyed grass snake have been found from the Upper Pliocene to the Upper Pleistocene in Spain.

== Description ==
The red-eyed grass snake can be distinguished from all other grass snakes by its reddish irises and fewer ventral scales. The species is known to show erythrism.

== Distribution and habitat ==
There are three disjunct populations of the red-eyed grass snake. The European population in found in the Iberian Peninsula and Occitania in southwestern France. The population in the Maghreb is divided into two disjunct subpopulations, one in northern Morocco and one in northwestern Tunisia and northeastern Algeria.

== Ecology ==
The red-eyed grass snake typically preys on fish and amphibians, and also eats small mammals and juvenile birds.

Like some other grass snakes, red-eyed grass snakes are known to raise their forebody and flatten their necks in an imitation of cobra behaviour, even though their ranges do not overlap. This is a relict from the Pliocene to Pleistocene, when cobras were extant in Europe and inhabited the same areas as grass snakes.

Red-eyed grass snakes reach maturity at 5 years. Egg-laying takes place in July and August. Young females are thought to lay clutches of around ten eggs, like in the related barred grass snake, while older females can lay as many as 100 eggs. Red-eyed grass snakes have been recorded infrequently interbreeding with other Natrix grass snakes. They are known to interbreed very rarely with the barred grass snake where the ranges of the two species meet, although gene flow between these two species is almost negligible. The red-eyed grass snake has also been recorded hybridizing with the more distantly related viperine water snake in Andalusia in southern Spain.

== Conservation ==
The red-eyed grass snake is listed as being of least concern in both the European and global IUCN Red Lists. It is rare in the North African part of its range, but is generally common in the European portion. Its population is currently decreasing, with a 2022 study finding that Spanish populations of snakes in the Natrix natrix complex had decreased by 49.1% from 1980 to 2017 and by 23.3% in the 18 year period preceding 2017. Although it is not threatened by any issues across its range, the snake faces localized threats from water pollution, persecution, and wildfires. As red-eyed grass snakes usually inhabit moist, shaded areas, they are absent from recently burned areas for up to one year after wildfires. In Iberia, red-eyed grass snakes are also more numerous in rivers with no invasive fish species; as invasive fish typically inhabit stretches of river with altered flow, this may reflect the impact of either the fish themselves or the habitat degradation that causes altered flow patterns.

The red-eyed grass snake is listed in Annex III of the Bern Convention and occurs in many protected areas. Measures that may benefit the species include building crossings under roads to reduce roadkill mortality, eliminating invasive fish, and restoring natural river hydrology.
