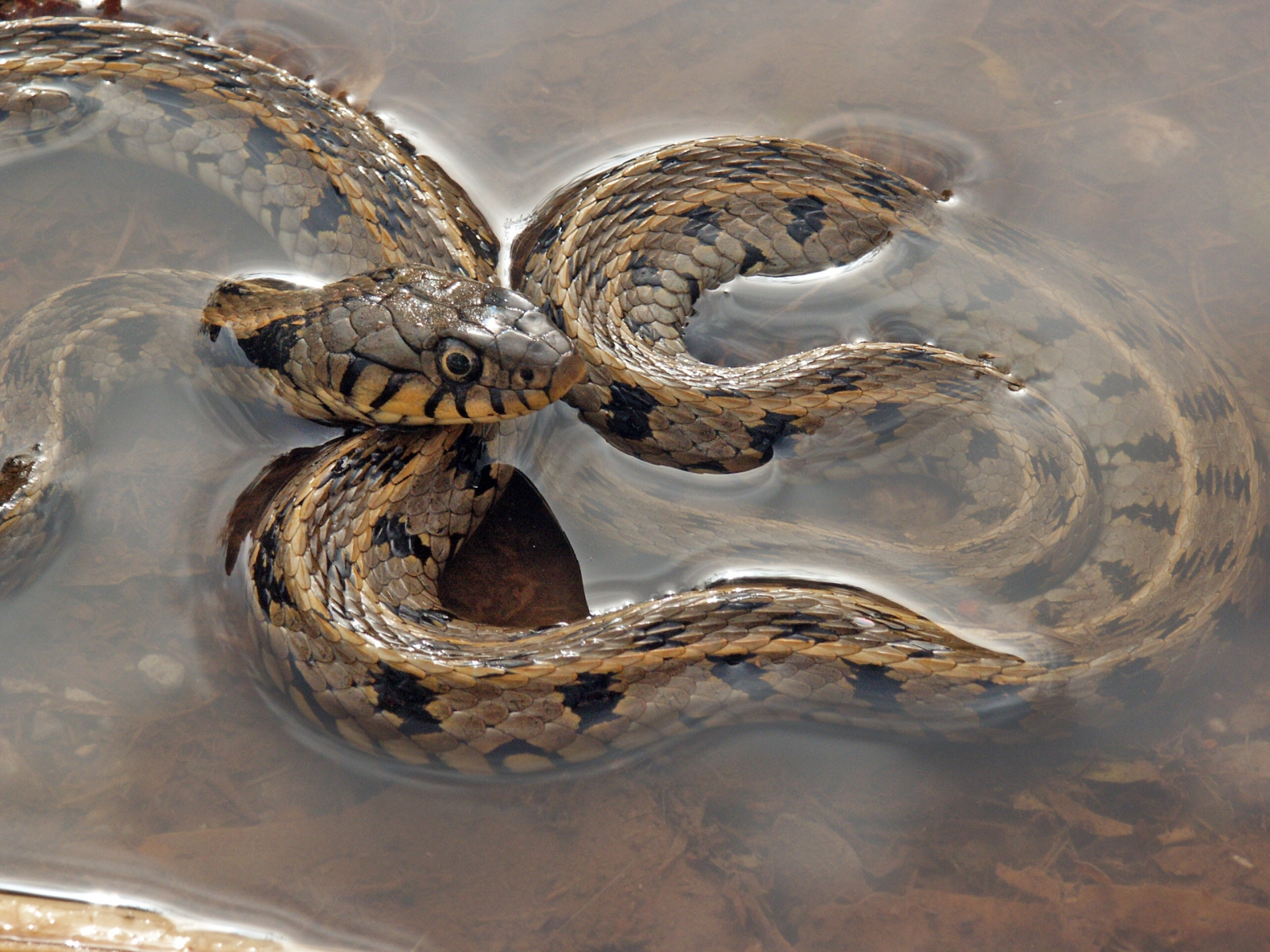
- Natrix natrix

Scientific classification
- Kingdom: Animalia
- Phylum: Chordata
- Class: Reptilia
- Order: Squamata
- Suborder: Serpentes
- Family: Colubridae
- Subfamily: Natricinae
- Genus: Natrix; Laurenti, 1768

Type species
- Natrix natrix

= Natrix =

Genus of snakes

Natrix is a genus of Old World snakes found mainly across Eurasia (although the range of Natrix tessellata extends into Egypt and those of N. astreptophora and N. maura into north-west Africa) in the subfamily Natricinae of the family Colubridae. They are commonly called grass snakes and water snakes, but some other snake species also known commonly as "grass snakes" and "water snakes" are not in the genus.

== Species ==
The genus Natrix contains five extant species and at least five extinct (fossil-only) species.

Image	Scientific name	Common name	Distribution
	Natrix astreptophora (Seoane, 1885)	Iberian grass snake	Iberian peninsula (Spain and Portugal), southern France, coastal north-west Africa (Morocco, Algeria, Libya, Tunisia)
	Natrix helvetica (Lacépède, 1789)	barred grass snake	Western Europe, including southern Great Britain
	Natrix maura (Linnaeus, 1758)	viperine water snake	Portugal, Spain, France, north-west Italy and into Switzerland; north-west Africa (Morocco, Algeria, Libya, Tunisia)
	Natrix natrix (Linnaeus, 1758)	grass snake	Mainland Europe from mid Scandinavia to southern Italy, to northern Middle East and Central Asia
	Natrix tessellata (Laurenti, 1768)	dice snake	Much of Eurasia, and Egypt
	†Natrix longivertebrata (Szyndlar, 1984)	extinct species (Pliocene, Miocene)	Poland, Austria, France
	†Natrix merkurensis Ivanov, 2002	extinct species (Miocene)	Czech Republic, France
	†Natrix mlynarskii Rage, 1988	extinct species (Eocene–Miocene)	France
	†Natrix parva Szyndlar, 1984	extinct species (Miocene)	Poland
	†Natrix sansaniensis (Lartet, 1851)	extinct species (Miocene)	Czech Republic, France

Nota bene: A binomial authority in parentheses indicates that the species was originally described in a genus other than Natrix.

== Etymology ==
Natrix is classical Latin for a water snake. The word comes from a Proto-Indo-European root meaning "snake", with cognates in the Celtic and Germanic languages, the latter including the English adder. It was probably influenced through folk etymology by the Latin nare and natare meaning "swim"; it appears to be a grammatically feminine word for "swimmer".

== Geography ==
The refuge of a widely distributed Western European lineage regarding the barred grass snake commonly known as Natrix helvetica was most likely located in southern France and outside the classical refuges in the southern European peninsulas. One genetic lineage of the common grass snake (N. natrix) is also distributed in Scandinavia, Central Europe, and the Balkan Peninsula.
