= Natrix longivertebrata =

Natrix longivertebrata Temporal range: early miocene–late pliocene

Scientific classification
- Kingdom: Animalia
- Phylum: Chordata
- Class: Reptilia
- Order: Squamata
- Suborder: Serpentes
- Family: Colubridae
- Genus: Natrix
- Species: †N. longivertebrata

Binomial name
- †Natrix longivertebrata Szyndlar, 1984

Extinct species of snake

Natrix longivertebrata is an extinct species of snake from genus Natrix which lived in Europe during the Miocene and Pliocene.

== History ==
It was found in Germany, Poland, France, Ukraine and Austria from Early Miocene to Late Pliocene. The species was once considered an ancestral species to N. natrix but modern scientific consensus agree that it is a species from its own lineage within the genus Natrix.
