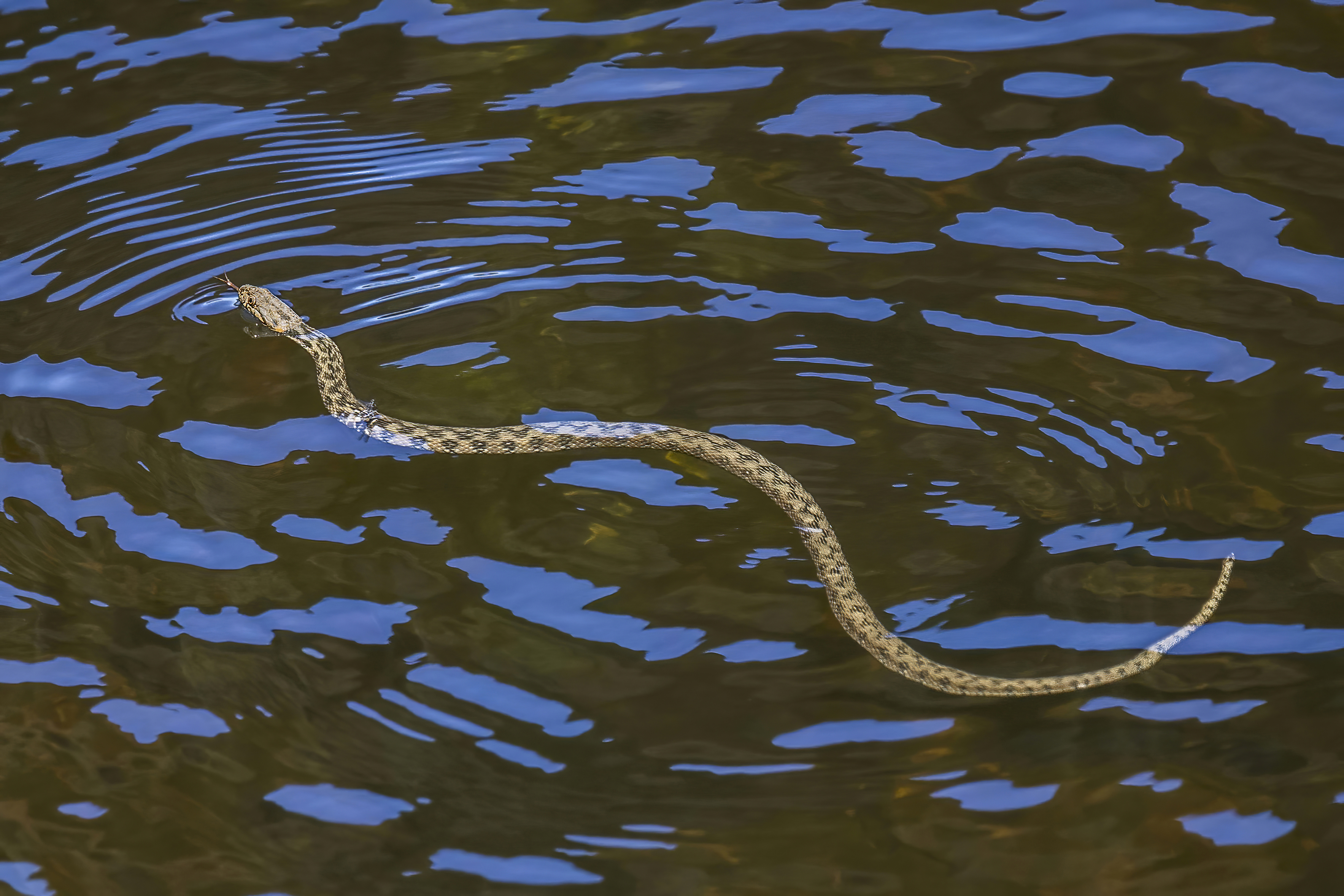
- Swimming, Spain

Conservation status
- Least Concern (IUCN 3.1)

Scientific classification
- Kingdom: Animalia
- Phylum: Chordata
- Class: Reptilia
- Order: Squamata
- Suborder: Serpentes
- Family: Colubridae
- Genus: Natrix
- Species: N. maura

Binomial name
- Natrix maura (Linnaeus, 1758)
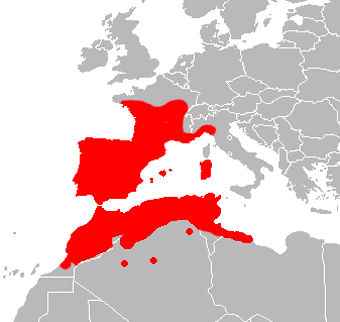
- Range map

Synonyms
- Coluber maurus Linnaeus, 1758; Coluber viperinus Sonnini & Latreille, 1802; Tropidonotus viperinus — Boulenger, 1893; Natrix maura — Arnold & Burton, 1978

= Natrix maura =

Species of snake

The viperine water snake or viperine snake (Natrix maura) is a semiaquatic, fish-eating natricine water snake. Despite its common names, it is not a member of the subfamily Viperinae. It was given its common names due to exhibiting a dorsal colour pattern that superficially resembles that of sympatric adder species. In comparison to other Natrix species its head is also somewhat wider and more distinct from the neck. Like most members of the Natricinae it possesses a venom gland on each side of the upper jaw (Duvernoy's gland) that produces a mild venom that may play a role in swallowing or digestion. The gland is not associated with an enlarged specialized tooth and the venom has to be applied by chewing. The species usually does not bite as a means of defense, and the effect of a bite would be harmless to humans.

== Behaviour ==
The viperine snake looks like an adder and occasionally behaves like one. It is known to strike like an adder, but not to bite. It spends most of its time in water hunting fish, frogs and other aquatic animals. The species is diurnal.

== Fossil record ==
Fossils of the viperine snake are known from El Chaparral, a fossil site in Villaluenga del Rosario that dates back to the latter part of the Early Pleistocene.

== Geographic range ==
The viperine snake is found in southwestern Europe and northwestern Africa. Specifically, N. maura is found in the European countries of France, northwestern Italy, Portugal, Spain, and western Switzerland. It is found in African countries of northern Algeria, northwestern Libya, Morocco, and northern to central Tunisia. It has also been introduced to the Balearic Islands and Sardinia.

== Description ==
N. maura is grey, brown, or reddish dorsally, with a black zigzag vertebral stripe, and lateral series of black ocelli with yellow centers. The labials are yellow with black sutures. It has a diagonal dark band on each temple, and another behind it on each side of the neck. Ventrally, it is yellow or red, checkered with black, or all black. The strongly keeled dorsal scales are arranged in 21 rows. The ventrals are 147–160; the anal plate is divided; and the paired subcaudals number 47–72. Adults may attain a total length of 85 cm (33 inches), with a tail 17 cm (7 inches) long.

== Habitat ==
The viperine snake is found in a variety of terrestrial and aquatic habitats, including forests, shrublands, inland wetlands, marine habitats and human-modified environments.

== Invasion ==
The species is invasive on Mallorca. N. maura predates on Pelophylax perezi among other prey on Mallorca. Research by Moore et al. 2004 suggests trophic subsidy provided by P. perezi is maintaining higher numbers of the invader than would otherwise occur. N. maura has altered the behavior of Mallorcan prey. Moore et al. 2004 found that the higher numbers mentioned above are allowing the invader to exert such high pressure that prey species such as the Majorcan midwife toad (Alytes muletensis) have retreated entirely to habitats too steep for N. maura.

== Conservation status ==
Natrix maura is classified as a least-concern species by the IUCN, although its numbers are declining. The species is widespread and adaptable, but local populations are threatened by aquatic pollution, changes to its habitat, loss of wetland and agricultural intensification, which can also reduce prey and shelter. Urbanisation and drought may pose additional threats in North Africa, while the snake’s tendency to accumulate pollutants may reduce survival and reproductive success.

== See also ==
- List of reptiles of Italy
