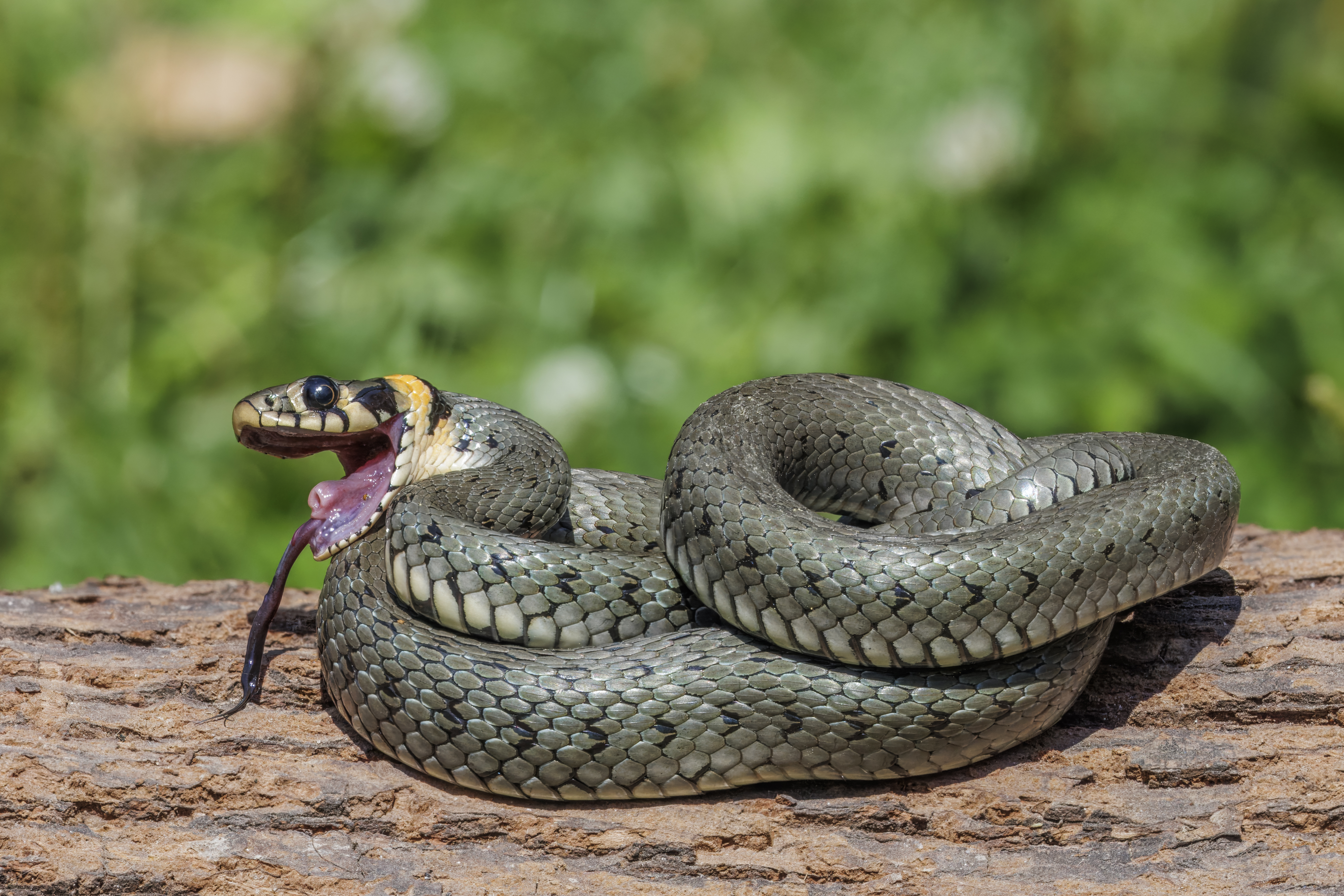

Conservation status
- Least Concern (IUCN 2.3)

Scientific classification
- Kingdom: Animalia
- Phylum: Chordata
- Class: Reptilia
- Order: Squamata
- Suborder: Serpentes
- Family: Colubridae
- Genus: Natrix
- Species: N. natrix

Binomial name
- Natrix natrix (Linnaeus, 1758)
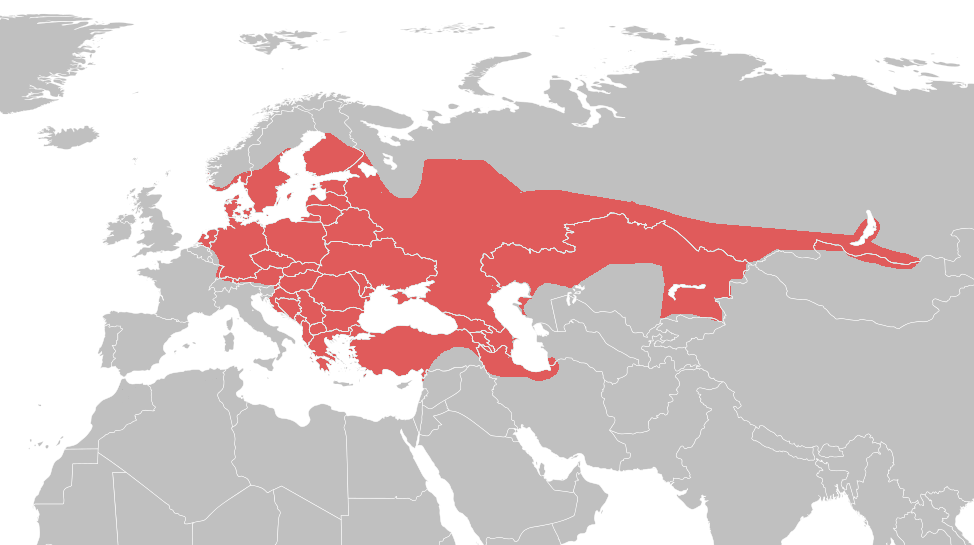
- Natrix natrix range map

Synonyms
- Coluber natrix Linnaeus, 1758; Natrix vulgaris Laurenti, 1768; Tropidonotus natrix F. Boie, 1827; Natrix natrix Stejneger, 1907

= Grass snake =

Species of snake

The grass snake (Natrix natrix), sometimes called the ringed snake or water snake, is a Eurasian semi-aquatic non-venomous colubrid snake. It is often found near water and feeds almost exclusively on amphibians.

== Subspecies ==
Many subspecies are recognized, including:

- Natrix natrix algirus (fide Sochurek, 1979)
- Natrix natrix calabra Vanni & Lanza, 1983
- Natrix natrix cypriaca (Hecht, 1930)
- Natrix natrix fusca Cattaneo, 1990
- Natrix natrix gotlandica Nilson & Andrén, 1981
- Natrix natrix natrix (Linnaeus, 1758)
- Natrix natrix persa (Pallas, 1814)
- Natrix natrix schweizeri L. Müller 1932
- Natrix natrix scutata (Pallas, 1771)

Natrix natrix helvetica (Lacépède, 1789) was formerly considered as a subspecies, but following a genetic analysis it was recognised in August 2017 as a separate species, Natrix helvetica, the barred grass snake. Four other subspecies were transferred from N. natrix to N. helvetica, becoming N. helvetica cettii, N. helvetica corsa, N. helvetica lanzai and N. helvetica sicula. The subspecies N. natrix astreptophora, found in the Iberian peninsula, the Pyrenees, and North-Western Africa, has been reclassified as its own species Natrix astreptophora or the Iberian grass snake.

== Description ==
The grass snake is typically dark green or brown in colour with a characteristic yellow or white collar behind the head, earning it the alternative name of 'ringed snake'. Its colouration can range from grey to black; darker colours are more prevalent in colder regions, presumably due to the thermal benefits of dark pigmentation. The underside is whitish with irregular black markings that are a useful field identification feature. It can grow to 1 m (3 ft 3 in) or more in length.

== Evolution ==
Fossils of N. natrix are known to date back to the late Early Pleistocene from the site of Somssich Hill 2 in southern Hungary.

== Distribution ==
The grass snake is widely distributed in mainland Europe, ranging from mid Scandinavia to southern Italy. It is also found in the Middle East and northwestern Africa.

Grass snakes in Britain were previously classified as the subspecies N. n. helvetica but have since been reclassified as the barred grass snake Natrix helvetica. Any records of N. natrix in Britain are now believed to be from imported specimens.

== Ecology ==
=== Feeding ===
Grass snakes mainly prey on amphibians, particularly the common toad and the common frog, although they may also occasionally eat ants and larvae. In captivity, grass snakes have been observed accepting earthworms offered by hand, but they never take dead prey. The snake actively searches for prey, often on the edges of the water, using sight and sense of smell (using Jacobson's organ). They consume prey live without using constriction.

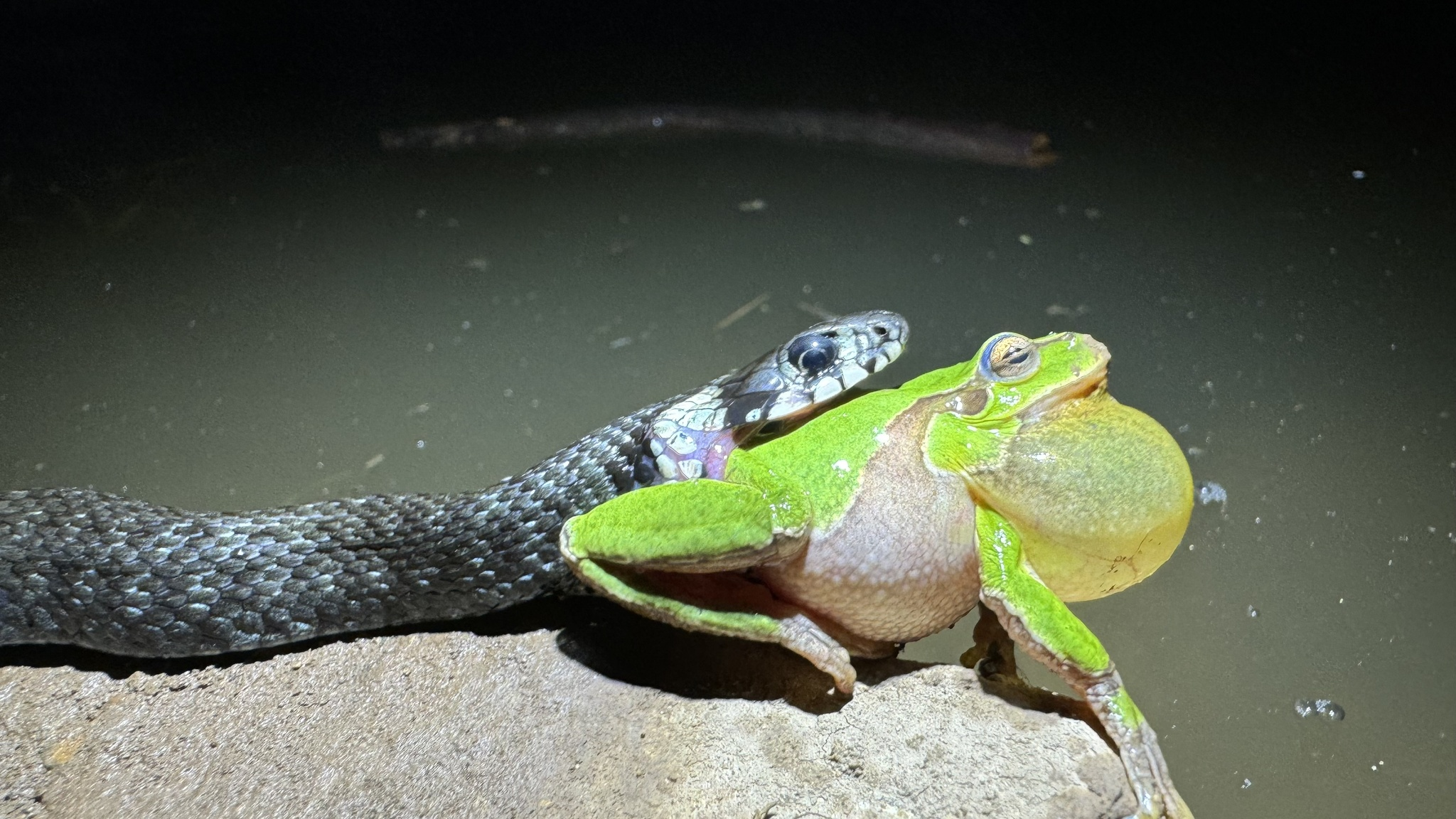
Eating an eastern tree frog

Eating a common toad

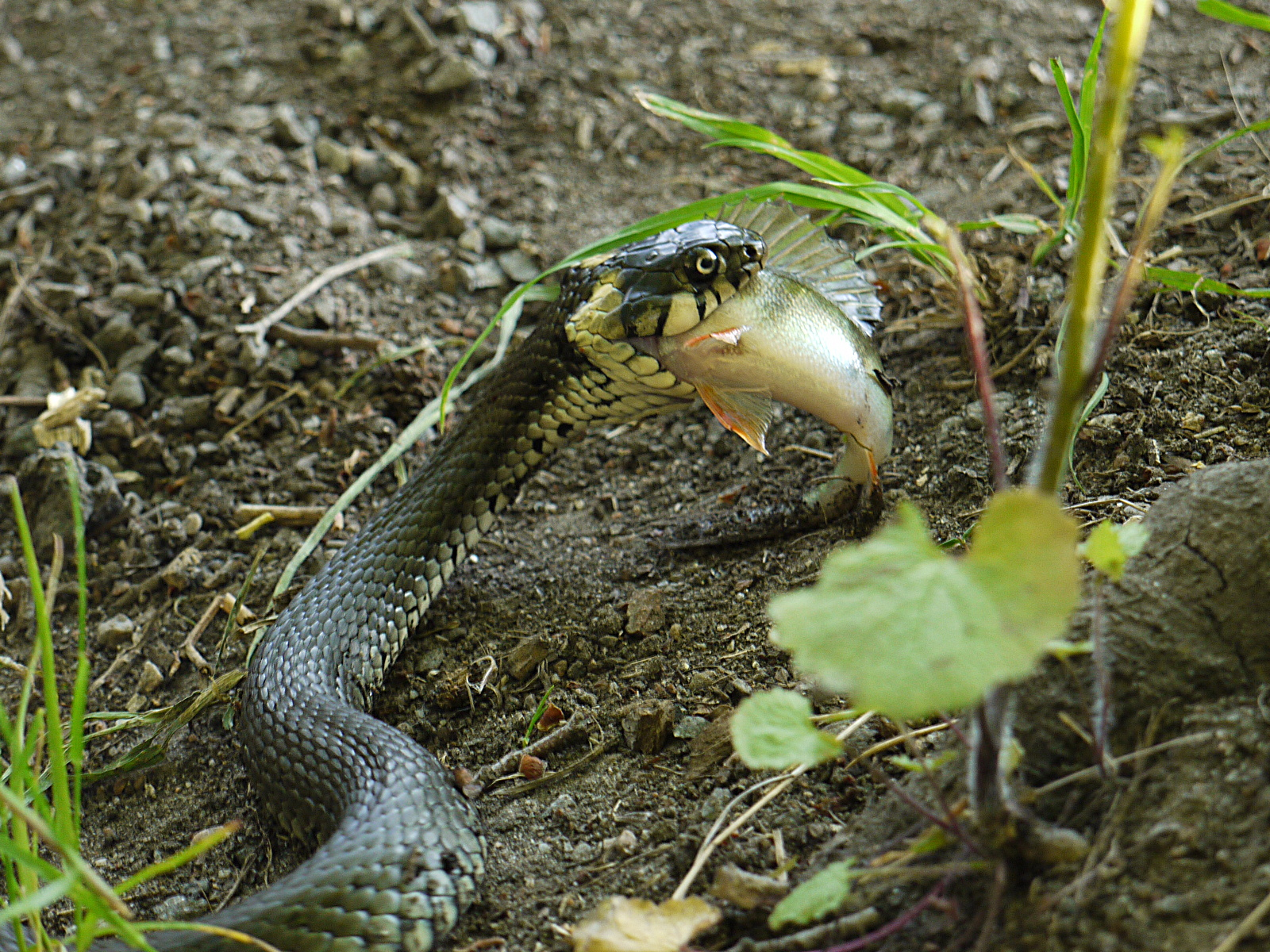
Eating European perch

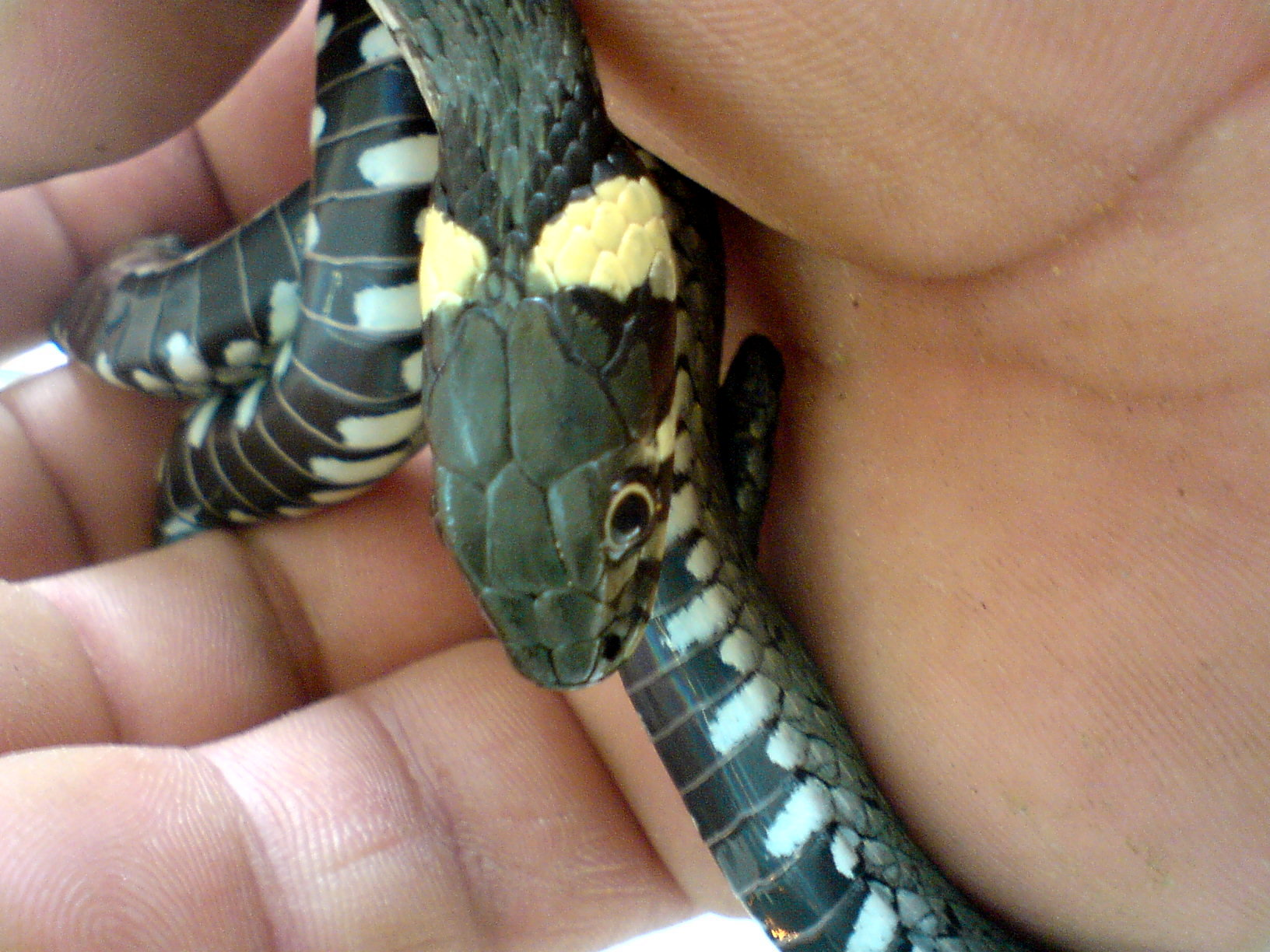
A specimen showing the distinctive yellow collar

=== Habitat ===
Grass snakes are strong swimmers and can be found near bodies to fresh water. However, there is evidence that individual snakes often do not always require access to water throughout the entire season.

The preferred habitat appears to be open woodland and "edge" habitats, such as field margins and woodland borders. These areas may offer adequate refuge while still affording ample opportunity for thermoregulation through basking. Pond edges are also favoured and the relatively high likelihood of observing this elusive species in these areas may explain why it is often associated with ponds and water.

Grass snakes, like most reptiles, are at the mercy of the thermal environment and need to overwinter in areas which are not subject to freezing. Thus, they typically spend the winter underground where the temperature is relatively stable.

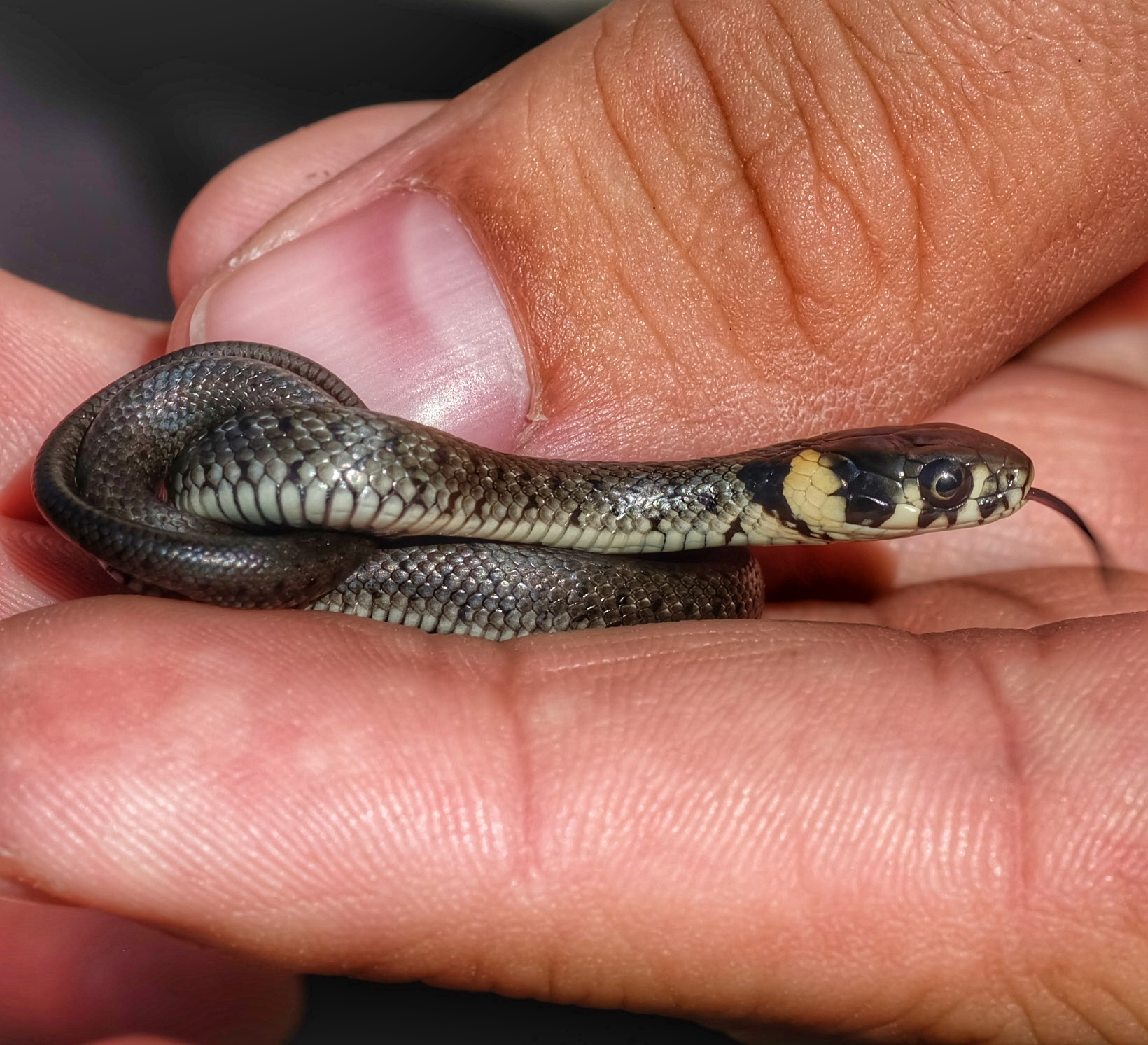
A juvenile grass snake.

=== Reproduction ===
As spring approaches, the males emerge first and spend much of the day basking in an effort to raise their body temperature, thereby increasing their metabolism. This may be a tactic to maximise sperm production, as the males mate with the females as soon as they emerge up to two weeks later in April, or earlier if environmental temperatures are favourable. The leathery eggs are laid in batches of 8 to 40 between June and July, and hatch after around 10 weeks. To survive and hatch, the eggs require a temperature of at least 21 °C (70 °F), but preferably 28 °C (82 °F) with high humidity. Areas of rotting vegetation, such as compost heaps, are preferred locations. The young measure about 18 centimetres (7 in) in length when they hatch and are immediately independent.

=== Migration ===
After breeding in summer, snakes tend to hunt and may travel widely during this time, moving up to several hundred metres in a day. Prey items tend to be large compared to the size of the snake, and this impairs the movement ability of the snake. Snakes that have recently eaten rarely move any significant distance, instead staying in one location and basking to optimise their body temperature until the prey item has been digested. Individual snakes may only require two or three significant prey items throughout an entire season.

=== Ecdysis (moulting) ===
Ecdysis occurs at least once during the active season. As the outer skin wears and the snake grows, the new skin forms underneath the old, including the eye scales which may turn a milky blue/white colour at this time. This is referred to as being 'in blue'. The blue-white colour comes from an oily secretion between the old and new skins, and the snake's coloration will also appear dull, as though the animal is dusty. This process affects the eyesight of the snakes and they do not move or hunt during this time. They are also more aggressive, as are most other snake species. Eventually, the outer skin sloughs of in one piece (inside out), after which normal movement and activity resume.

=== Defence ===
In defence they can produce a garlic-smelling fluid from their anal glands, and feign death (thanatosis) by becoming completely limp when they may also secrete blood (autohaemorrhage) from the mouth and nose. They may also perform an aggressive display in defence, hissing and striking without opening the mouth. They rarely bite in defence and lack venomous fangs. When caught they often regurgitate the contents of their stomachs.

Grass snakes display a rare defensive behaviour involving raising the front of their bodies and flattening their heads and necks so that they resemble cobras. However, the geographic ranges of grass snakes and of cobras overlap very little. However, the fossil record shows that the extinct European cobra Naja romani occurs in Miocene-aged strata of France, Germany, Austria, Romania, and Ukraine, thus overlapping with Natrix species including the extinct Natrix longivertebrata. This suggests that the grass snake's behavioural mimicry of cobras is a fossil behaviour, although it may also serve as protection against predatory birds that migrate to Africa for the winter and encounter cobras there.

=== Protection and threats ===
The species has various predator species, including corvids, storks, owls and perhaps other birds of prey, foxes, and the domestic cat.

In Denmark it is protected, as all five species of reptiles were protected in 1981. Two of the subspecies are considered critically endangered: N. n. cetti (Sardinian grass snake) and N. n. schweizeri.

== Mythology ==
=== Baltic ===
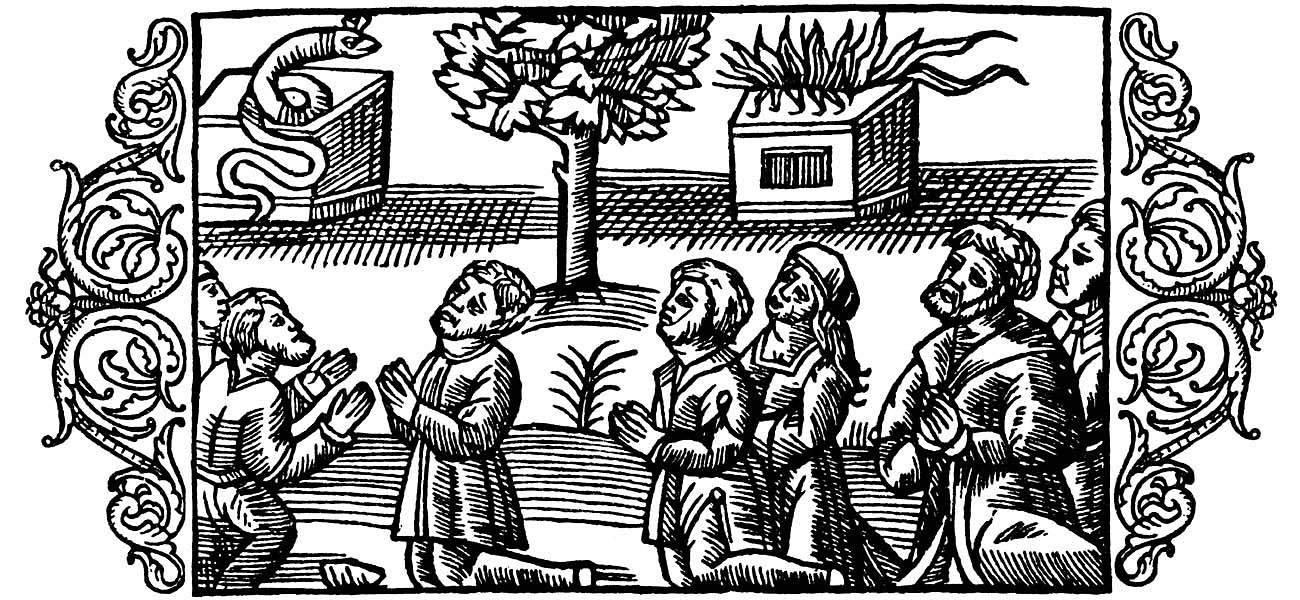
Lithuanians worshipping a grass snake (žaltys) and holy fire. From Olaus Magnus' Historia de Gentibus Septentrionalibus (History of the Northern People), book 3, 1555

Grass snakes are the primary symbol of Lithuanian neo-paganism

In Baltic mythology, the grass snake (Lithuanian: žaltys, Latvian: zalktis, Old Prussian: angzdris) is seen as a sacred animal. It was frequently kept as a pet, living under a married couple's bed or in a special place near the hearth. Supposedly, snakes ate food given to them by hand.

Even after the Christianization of Lithuania and Latvia, the grass snake still retained some mythological significance. Despite the serpent's symbolic meaning as a symbol of evil in Christianity, various folk beliefs in Latvia and Lithuania dating even to the late 19th century held that killing grass snakes might bring grave misfortune, or that an injured snake would take revenge on the offender. Ancient Baltic beliefs about grass snakes as household spirits transformed into a belief that a snake (known or not to the inhabitants) lives under every house and that if it leaves, the house will burn down. Common Latvian folk sayings include "who kills a grass snake, kills his happiness" and "when the Saulė sees a dead grass snake, she cries for 9 days".

Well-known literary works based on these traditions include Lithuanian folk tale Eglė the Queen of Serpents (Eglė žalčių karalienė) and the Latvian folk fairytale "The grass snake's bride" (Zalkša līgava). These works feature a prevalent theme in Baltic mythology: that grass snakes wear crowns (note grass snake's yellow spots) and that there is a king of snakes who wears a golden crown. According to some traditions, the king of snakes changes every year, dropping his crown in spring, after which the other snakes fight over it (possibly based on the mating of grass snakes).

Today, many Latvians and Lithuanians believe that grass snakes bring good luck and protect the home. One tradition is to put a bowl of milk near a snake's place of residence, although there is no evidence of a grass snake ever drinking milk. Driven by late 19th century and 20th century Romantic nationalism, grass snake motifs in Latvia have come to symbolise education and wisdom, and are common ornaments in the military, folk dance groups and education logos and insignia. They are also found on the Lielvārde Belt.

=== Roman ===
Virgil in his 29 BC Georgics (book III, lines 425-439: ) describes the grass snake as a large feared snake living in marshes in Calabria, eating frogs and fish.

== Gallery ==
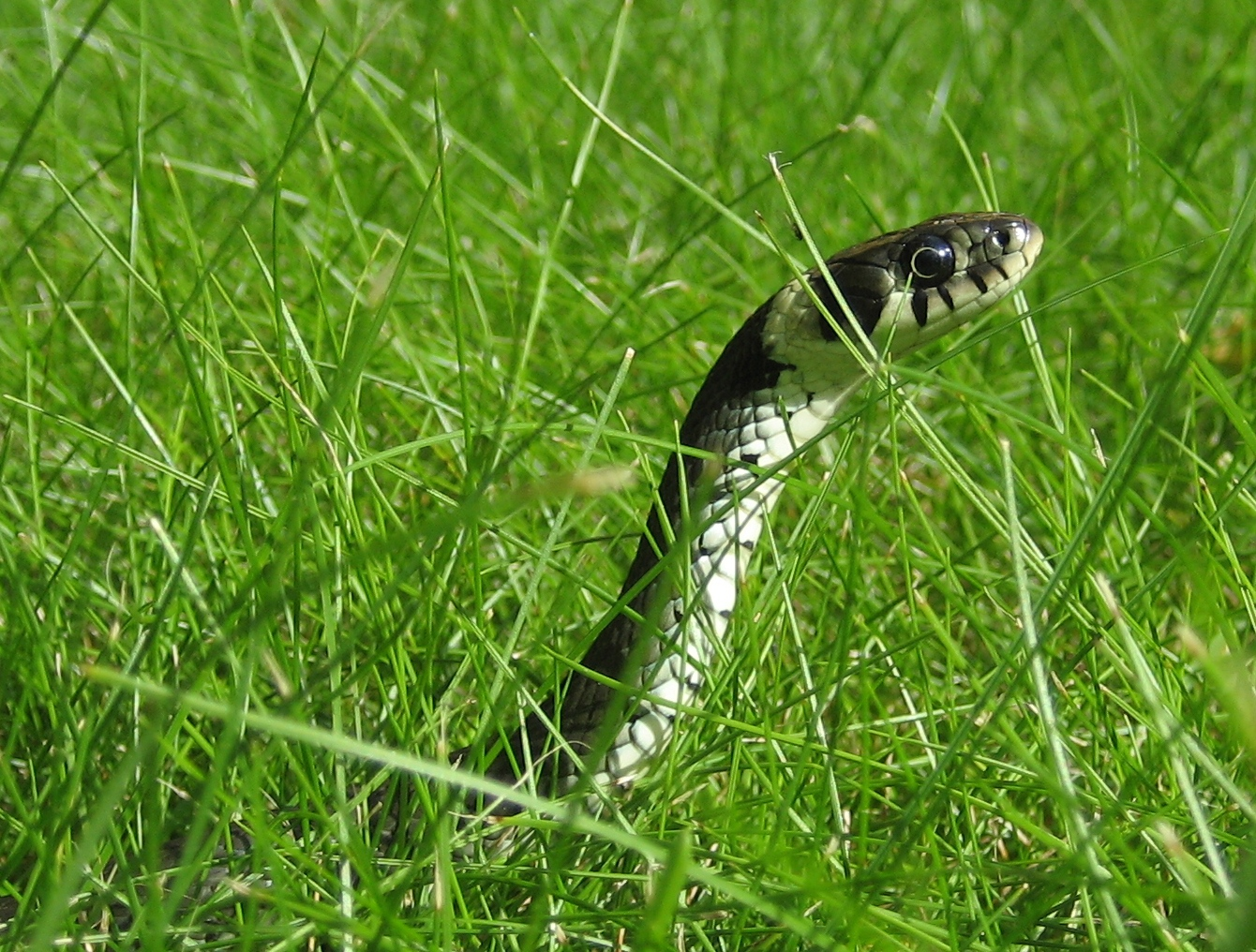
Hunting in early autumn, Sweden

Copulation

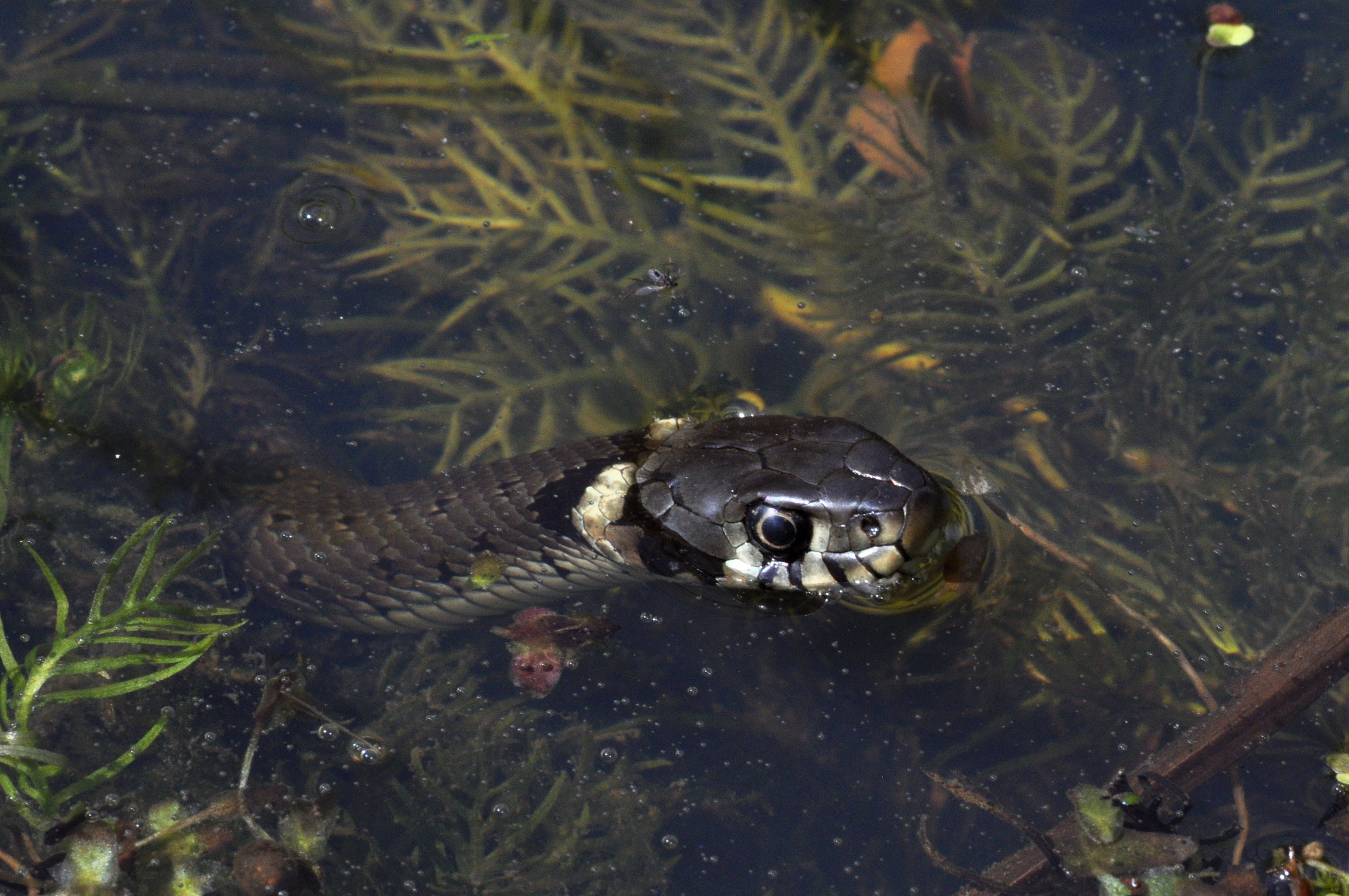
Grass snake looking out its hideout of water violet in Kirchwerder, Hamburg

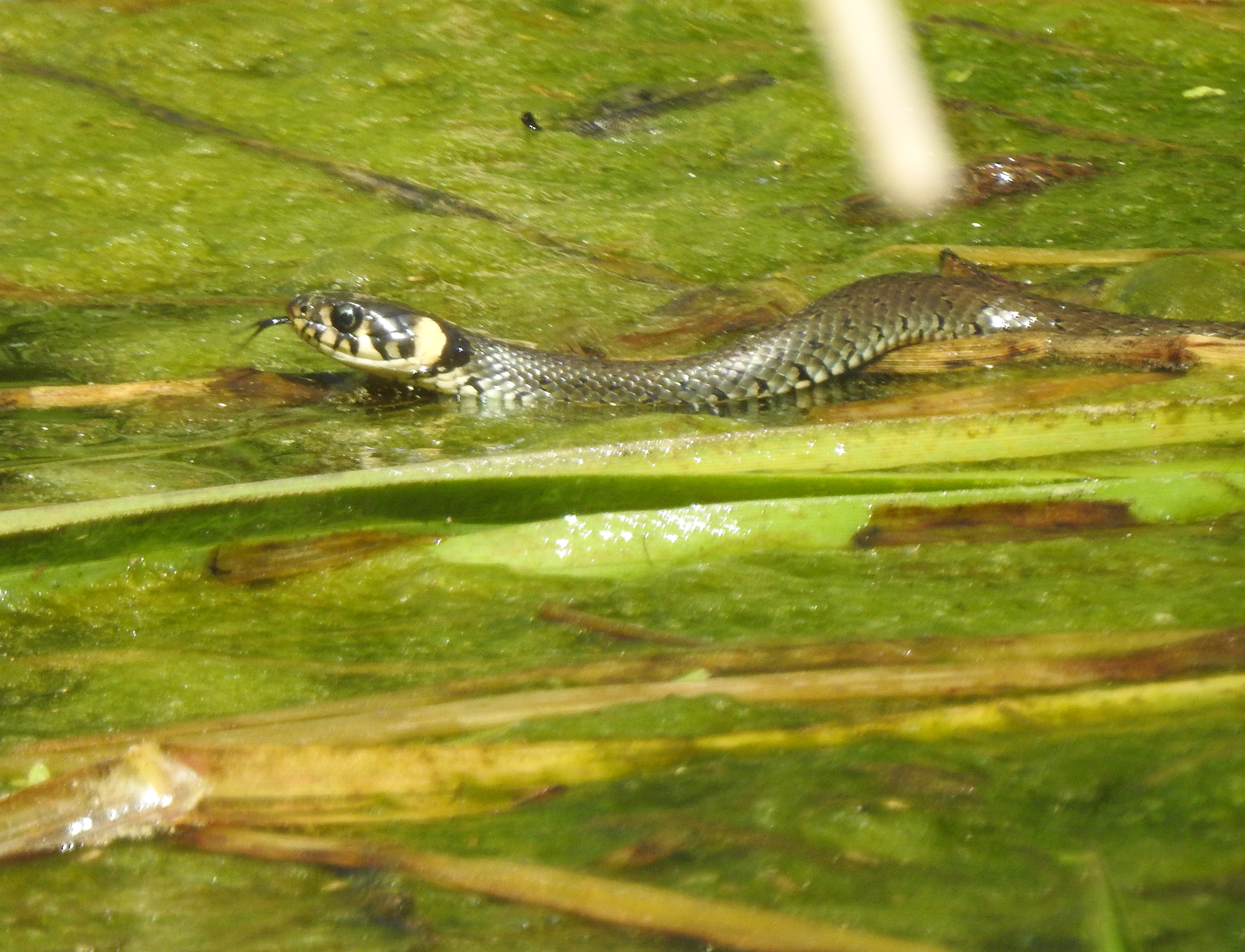
Grass snake in a pond in the nature resort in Zell am See, Salzburg (state), Austria.

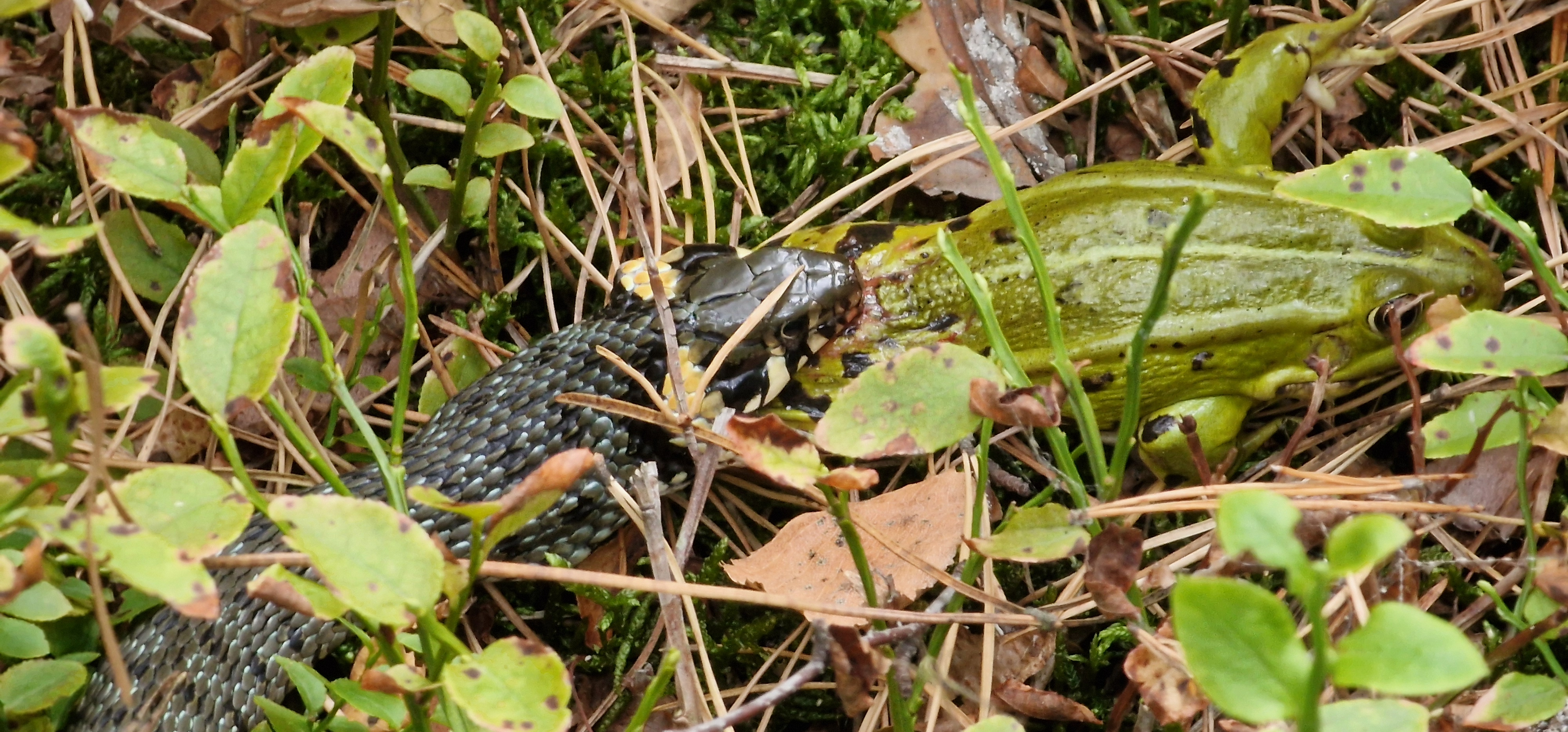
Grass snake eating a frog in the forest in Poland
