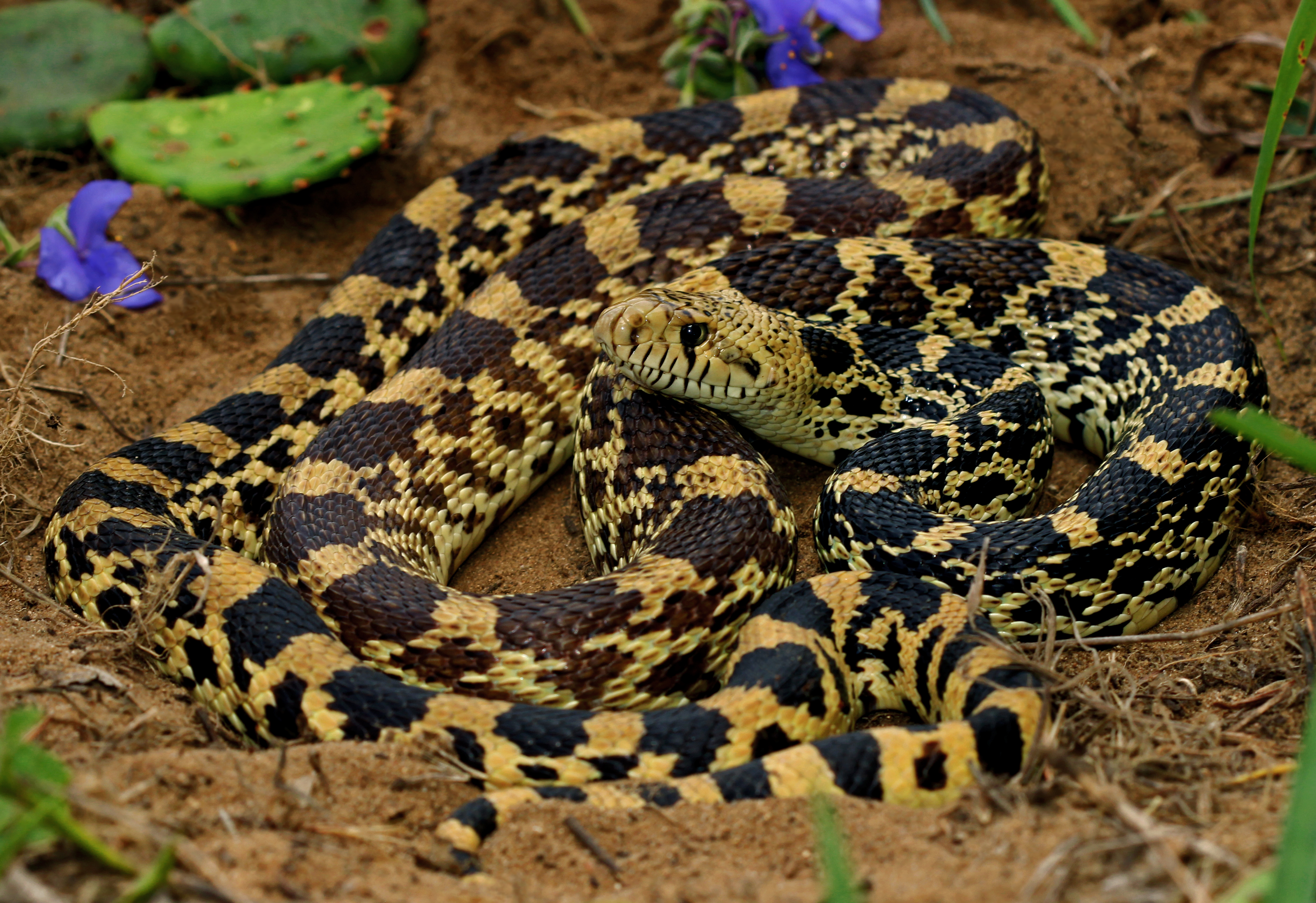
- Pituophis catenifer sayi, Mason County, Illinois

Scientific classification
- Kingdom: Animalia
- Phylum: Chordata
- Class: Reptilia
- Order: Squamata
- Suborder: Serpentes
- Family: Colubridae
- Genus: Pituophis
- Species: P. catenifer
- Subspecies: P. c. sayi

Trinomial name
- Pituophis catenifer sayi (Schlegel, 1837)
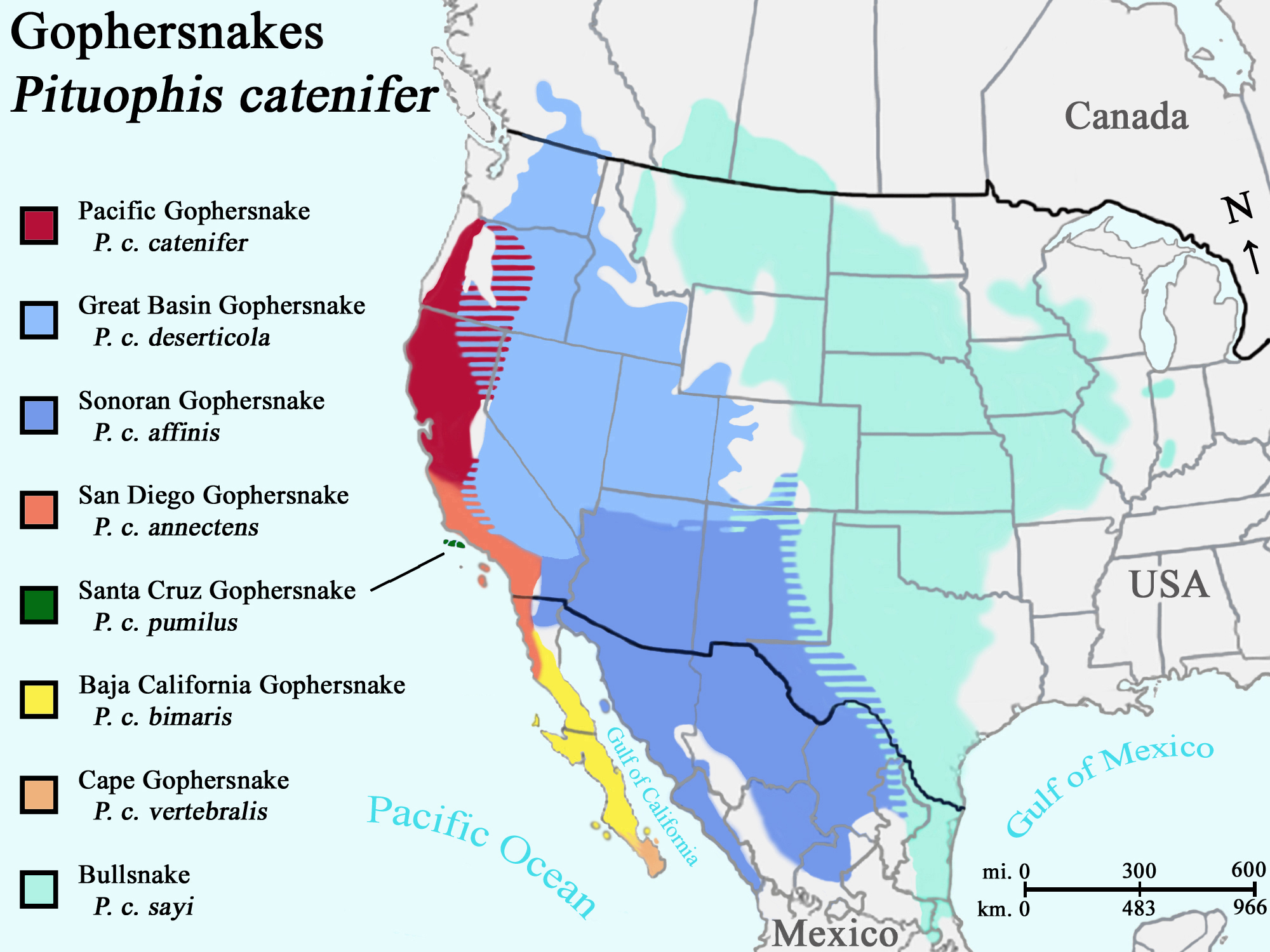
- Distribution of Pituophis catenifer

Synonyms
- Coluber sayi Schlegel, 1837; Pityophis sayi sayi — Cope, 1900; Pituophis sayi — Stejneger & Barbour, 1917; Pituophis sayi sayi — Schmidt & Davis, 1941; Pituophis catenifer sayi — Wright & Wright, 1957; Pituophis melanoleucus sayi — Conant, 1975; Pituophis catenifer sayi — Collins, 1997

= Bullsnake =

Subspecies of reptile

The bullsnake (Pituophis catenifer sayi) is a large, nonvenomous, colubrid snake. It is a subspecies of the gopher snake (Pituophis catenifer). The bullsnake is one of the largest/longest snakes of North America, reaching lengths up to 8 ft.

== Etymology ==
The subspecific name, sayi, is in honor of American naturalist Thomas Say.
In Mexico, bullsnakes are called cincuate (from Nahuatl sentli 'corn' and coatl 'snake').
They are known as bull snakes because of the deep hissing/rumbling sound they make when nervous, which can be reminiscent of a bellowing bull, as well as their overall defensive display of rearing up like a rattlesnake and rattling their tail in leaves, all of which is a bluff; the snake is not venomous and rarely bites.

== Geographic range ==
The bullsnake (Pituophis catenifer sayi) occurs throughout the Great Plains and parts of the Midwestern United States, ranging from southern Saskatchewan and Alberta, Canada, south into Mexico, including Nuevo León and Tamaulipas, southeast San Luis Potosi, and extreme northern Veracruz, and Hidalgo. States in the US include Colorado, Illinois, Indiana, Iowa, Kansas, Minnesota, Missouri, Montana, Nebraska, New Mexico, North Dakota, Oklahoma, South Dakota, Texas, Wisconsin, and Wyoming.

== Description ==
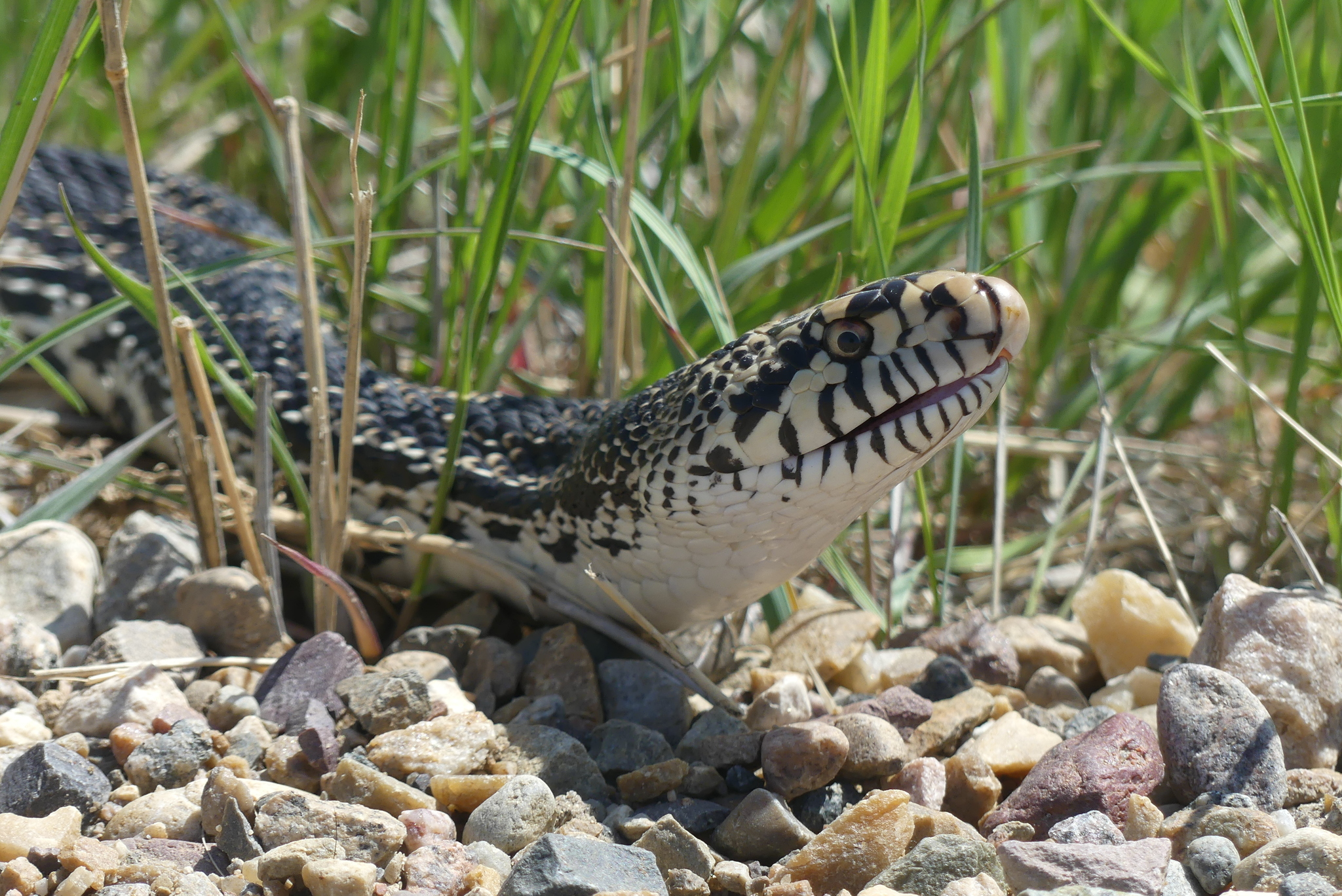
Head of a bullsnake showing large and raised rostral scale, Saskatchewan, Canada

Adult bullsnakes average about 4 to 6 ft (1.2 to 1.8 m) in length, and specimens up to 8 ft 4 in (2.5 m) have been recorded. The maximum record for the species is 110 in. (279 cm.). Possibly being the largest subspecies of gopher snake on average, mature specimens can have a typical weight in the range of 1.0–1.5 kg (2.2–3.3 lb), though the heavier known specimens can attain 3.6–4.5 kg (7.9–9.9 lb), with larger specimens being quite bulky for a colubrid snake. This makes bullsnakes among the largest snakes native to Canada and the United States, although they are generally not as long as indigo snakes nor as heavy or as large in diameter as rattlesnakes. They are usually yellow, with brown, white, black, or sometimes reddish blotching. The blotching pattern is large blotches on top, three sets of spots on the sides, and bands of black on the tail. Many color variations have been found, including albinos and white varieties. A scale count is required to distinguish juvenile bullsnakes from other juvenile gopher snakes.

Bullsnakes have 33‒66 dark dorsal blotches on the body, usually 41 or more, and 9‒19 on the tail, which are often darker and bolder on the neck and tail and lighter and faded midbody. The dorsal scale rows range from 27‒37 at midbody, usually 29, 31, or 33. Bullsnakes are distinguished from other gophersnake subspecies in having large narrow rostral scale (the scale at the tip of the nose), that is higher than wide and protrudes above adjacent scales, giving the snout a relatively pointed appearance when viewed from above.

== Habitat ==
These snakes prefer prairies, grasslands, and woodlands that provide open and dry ecosystems; they are often found in well-drained, sandy soils, and can occupy both natural and human-made environments.

== Diet ==
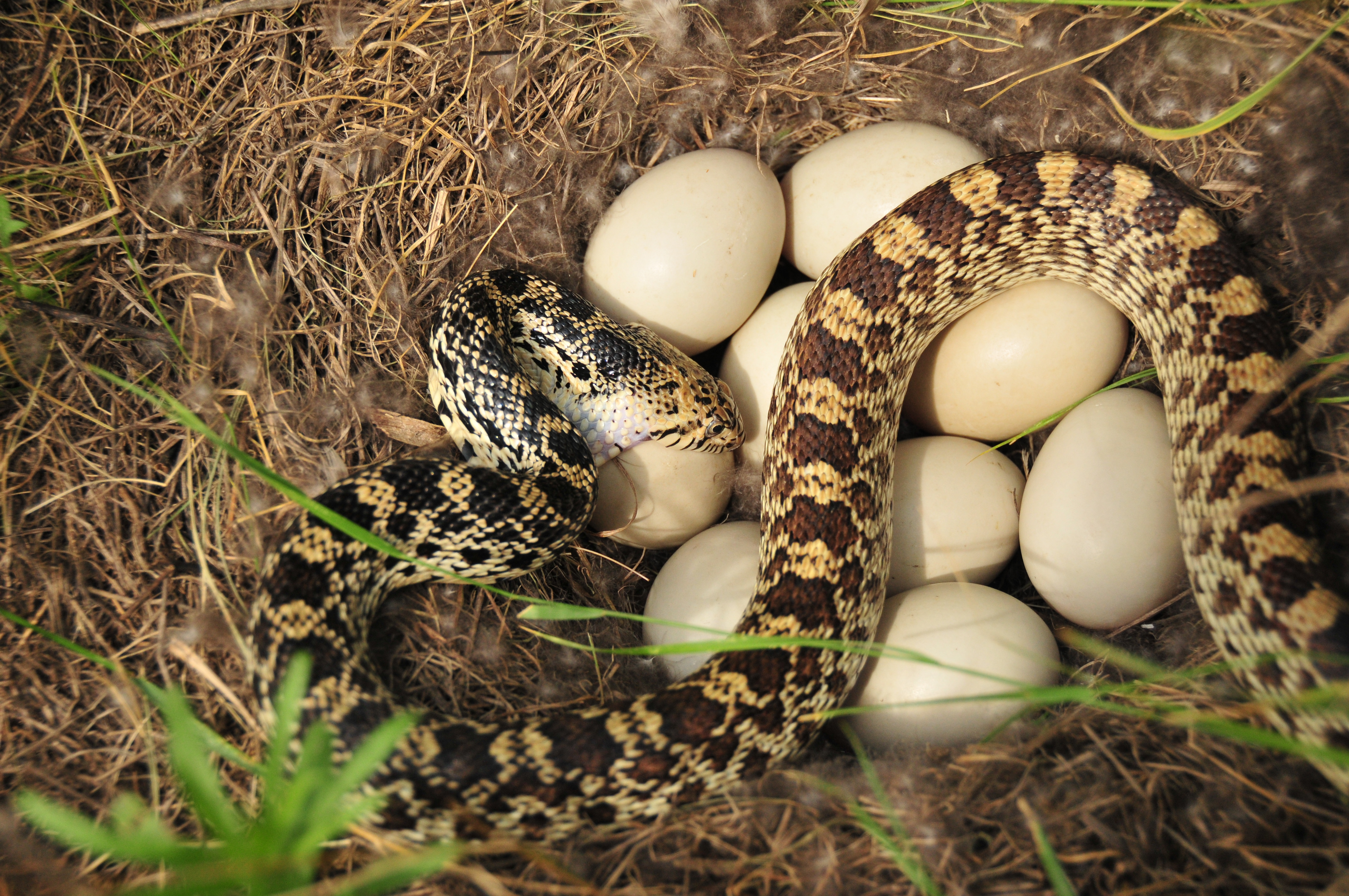
Bullsnake preying on mallard eggs

Bullsnakes are very powerful constrictors that eat small mammals, such as mice (including Peromyscus and Reithrodontomys spp.), moles, voles, rats (including Dipodomys spp.), pocket gophers, ground squirrels (including Spermophilus spp.), young rabbits, and bats, as well as ground-nesting birds, birds' eggs, smaller snakes (including Crotalus spp.), lizards (including Uta spp.), and insects. Their climbing proficiency enables them to raid birdnests (and birdhouses) to eat the nestlings or sitting mother. One snake can eat five small birds within 15 minutes. Juvenile bullsnakes depend on small lizards, frogs, and baby mice.

The idea that bullsnakes occasionally eat rattlesnakes is sometimes given as a reason for humans not to harm bullsnakes when encountering them in the wild; however, a study of 1000 bullsnakes found only two had rattlesnake in their stomach contents, so this is a very rare occurrence.

== Behavior ==
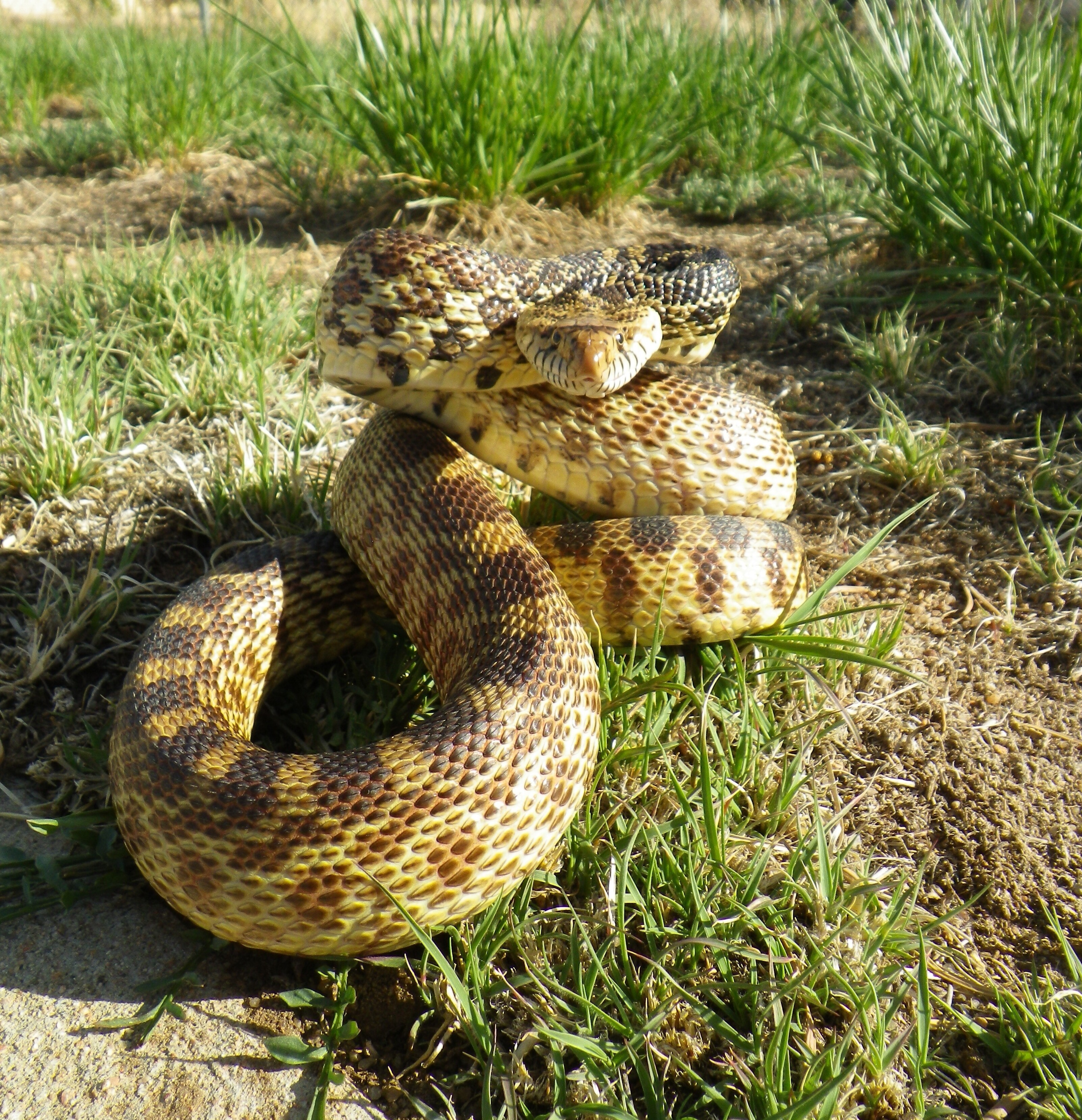
Bullsnake in defensive posture, El Paso County, Colorado

Though some bullsnakes can be docile, and with some time become accustomed to handling, most are quite defensive.

When bullsnakes detect live objects too big to be prey, they seem to perceive the object as a predator and take defensive action. Their first action is to remain quiet, not moving. Then, when they feel they are able to move away from the object, their next line of defense is to move away as quickly as possible. Bullsnakes, however, are not fast movers and often must take other defensive actions. When threatened by any animal as large as a human, a bullsnake's next defensive action is to rear up and make itself look as large as possible, while at the same time hissing at the perceived threat. It typically then begins lunging and retreating at the same time to escape.

Bullsnakes can sometimes be mistaken for rattlesnakes and killed. Owing to their coloration, dorsal pattern, and semikeeled scalation, they superficially resemble the western diamondback rattlesnake (Crotalus atrox), which is also common within the same range. The bullsnake capitalizes on this similarity by performing an impressive rattlesnake impression when threatened. First, it hisses, or forcibly exhales through a glottis or extension of the windpipe. The end of the glottis is covered by a piece of cartilage known as the epiglottis, which flaps back and forth when air is exhaled from the right lung, producing a convincing rattling sound. It also adopts a rattlesnake-like "S-curve" body posture as though about to strike. It commonly vibrates its tail rapidly in brush or leaves, and flattens its head to resemble the characteristic triangular shape of the rattlesnake. These defensive behaviors are meant to scare away threats, however, and not to sound an attack.

In contrast to rattlesnakes, which usually keep their tails elevated to sound the most efficient rattle, bullsnakes tend to keep their tails in contact with the ground, where they can be vibrated against leaves, for example.

== Thermoregulation ==
Bullsnakes are ectothermic reptiles and need to regulate their body temperature via thermoregulation. One study on northern populations in Canadian grasslands found that they can often be observed basking in sunny areas when needing to warm up and retreat into their burrows when needing to cool down. Bullsnakes actually prefer burrows in open grassland areas as opposed to shaded woodland areas, because living in an open space makes thermoregulation easier. Rather than avoiding trees and overhanging vegetation to reach a sunny area, bullsnakes can simply bask in the sun at the mouth of their burrows. Thermal gradients also play a role in bullsnake thermoregulation, as different temperatures at different locations determine where the snake travels throughout the day to maintain its preferred body temperature.

In northern regions of their range, bullsnakes enter a dormant state called brumation to conserve energy during the winter. They brumate in their burrows below the frostline typically from October to April. They often nest in large colonies even with various species of snakes including rattlesnakes and garter snakes to conserve heat. Bullsnakes can also shut off blood flow to certain areas of the body to control body temperature. They decrease blood flow to the head when they are too warm to expel heat from their tails and increase blood flow to their heads in colder temperatures to conserve heat.

== Reproduction ==
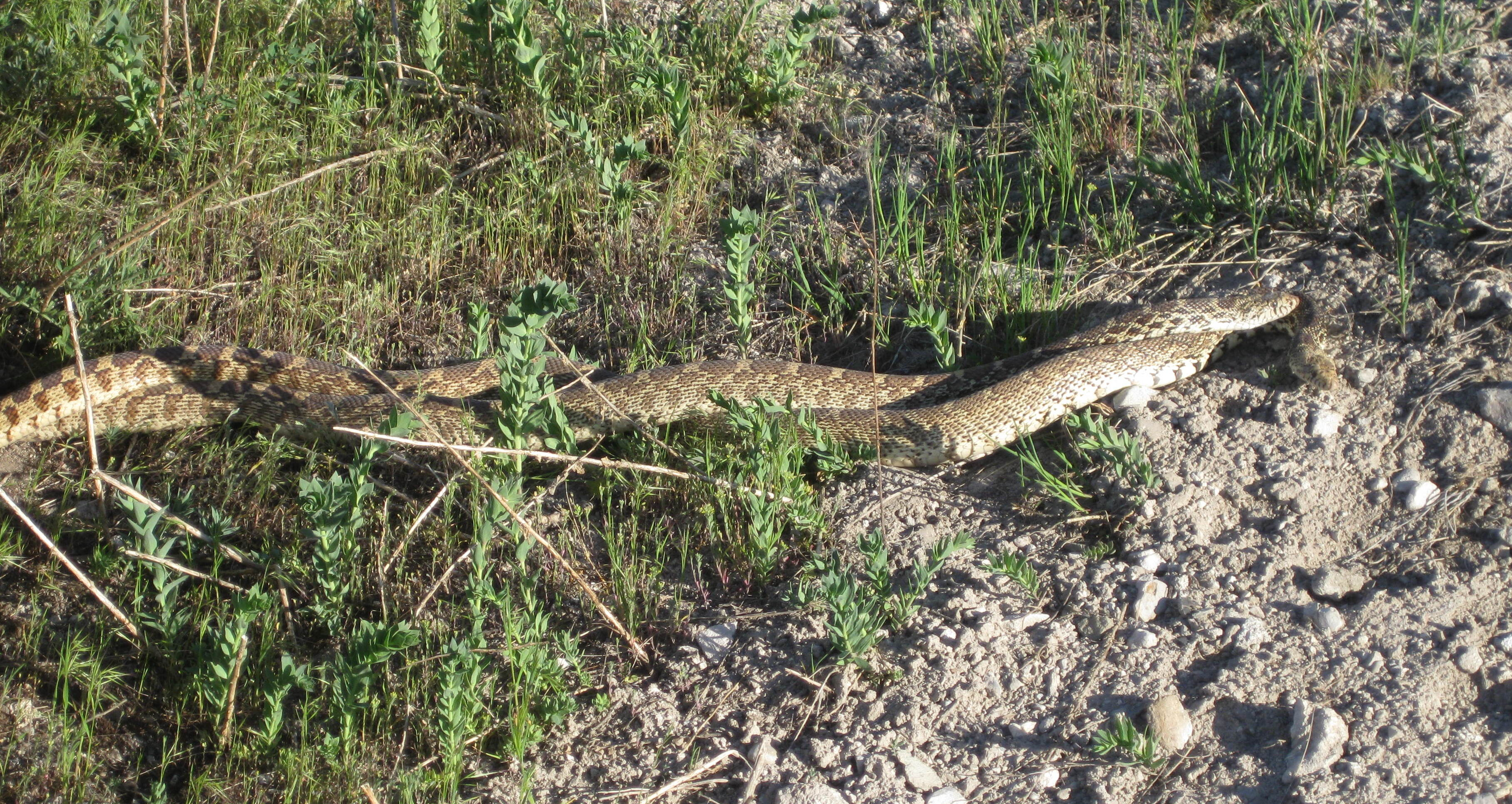
Bullsnakes mating in Yellowstone National Park, Wyoming

Male bullsnakes reach maturity in 1-2 years, while females reach maturity in 3-5 years, both at a total length of 90‒96 cm. They breed in March or April (depending upon their location) and usually lay their eggs in April, May, or June (again, depending upon when the snakes breed). In northern regions of their distribution, mating usually takes place near the hibernaculum. They typically lay 12 eggs in sand or other protected areas and leave the eggs to incubate unprotected. Clutches of five to 22 eggs have been observed. The eggs are elliptical, leathery, rough, sticky, and up to 70 mm (2 3/4 in) long. The eggs typically hatch in August or September but, June 30 to November 7 hatching have been recorded. Baby bullsnakes are 20–55 cm (7.9–21.7 in) at hatching. Their color is grayish until after their first shed.

== Gallery ==
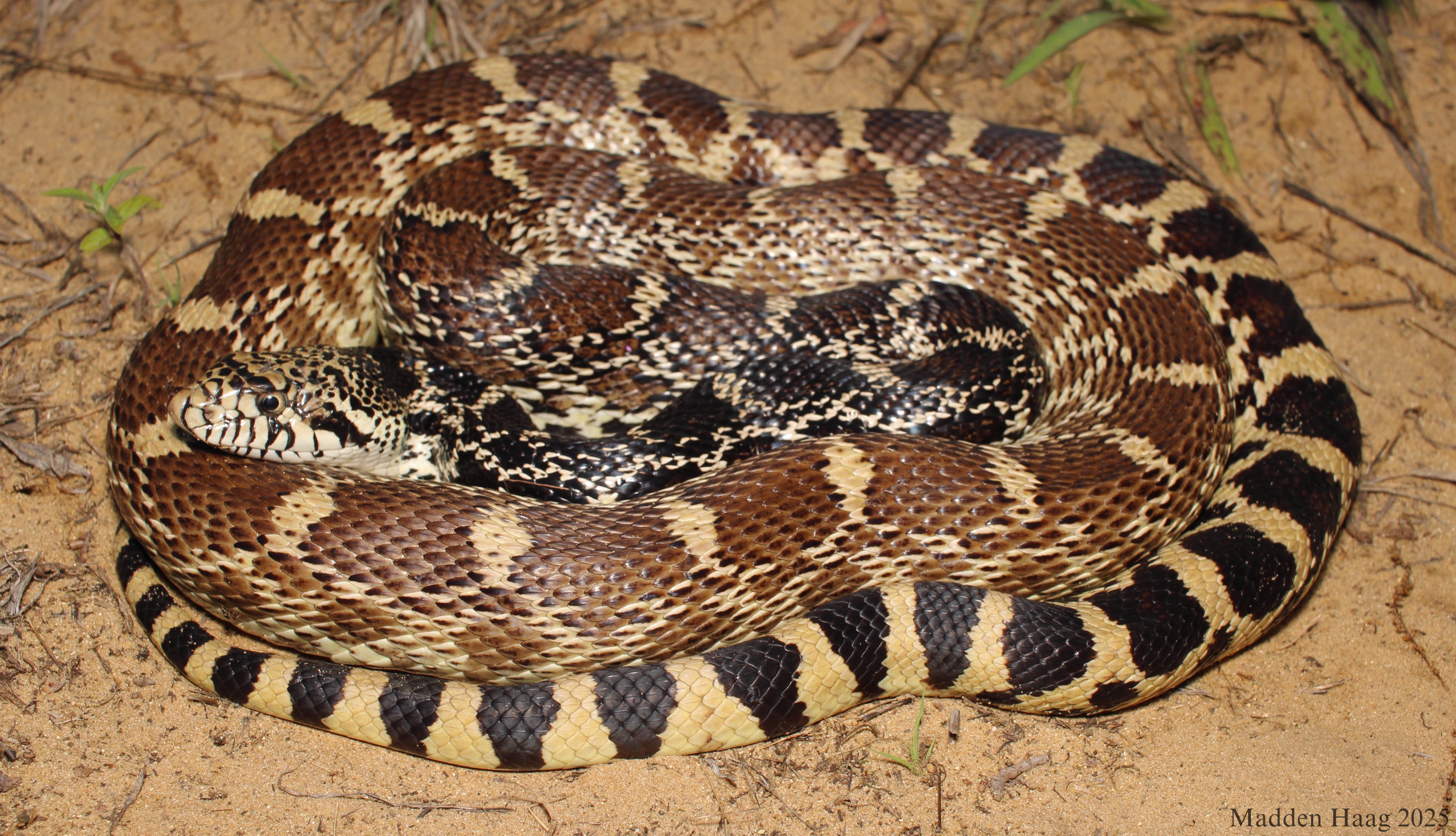
Bullsnake (P. c. sayi) from unknown locality

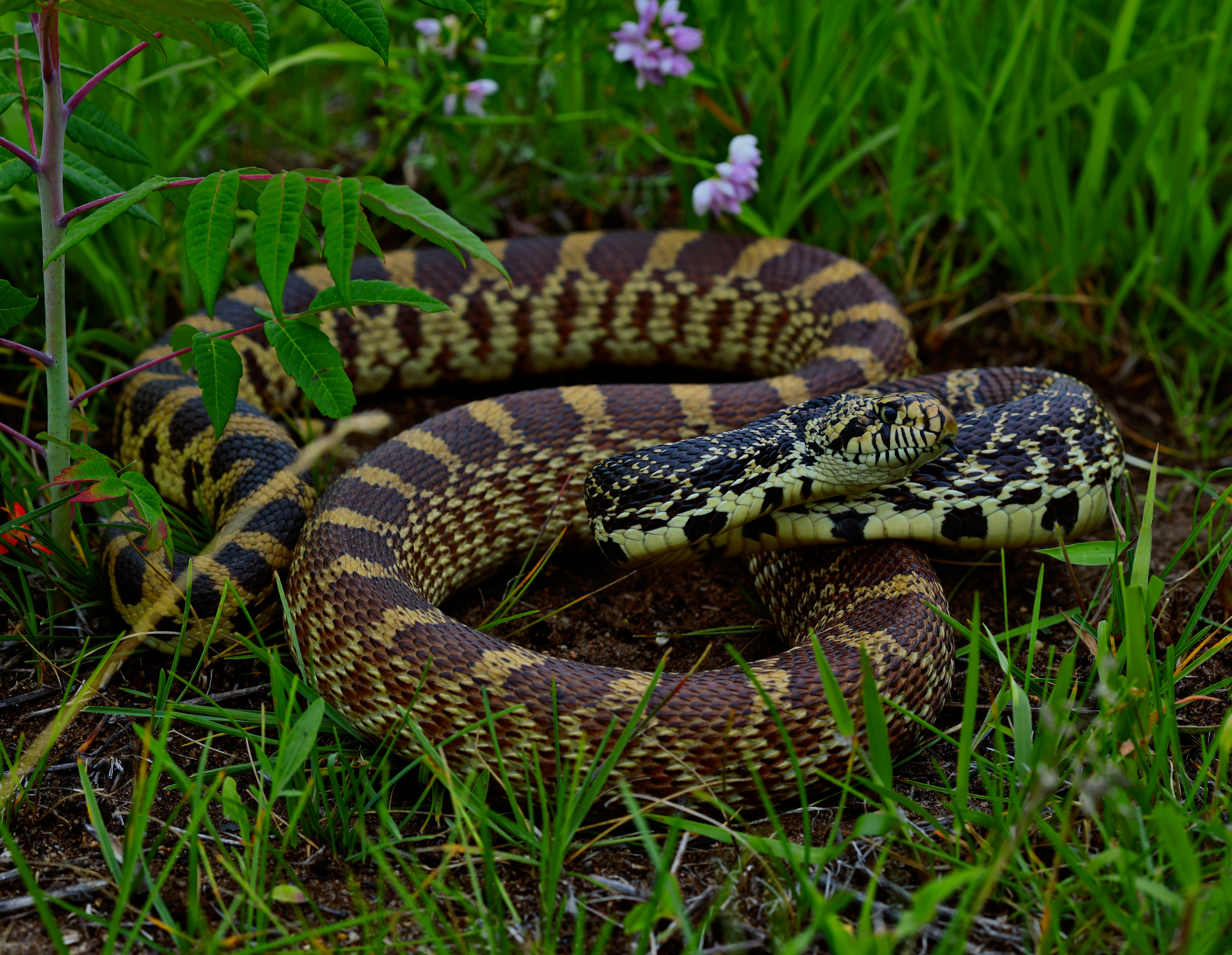
Bullsnake (P. c. sayi), Clark County, Missouri

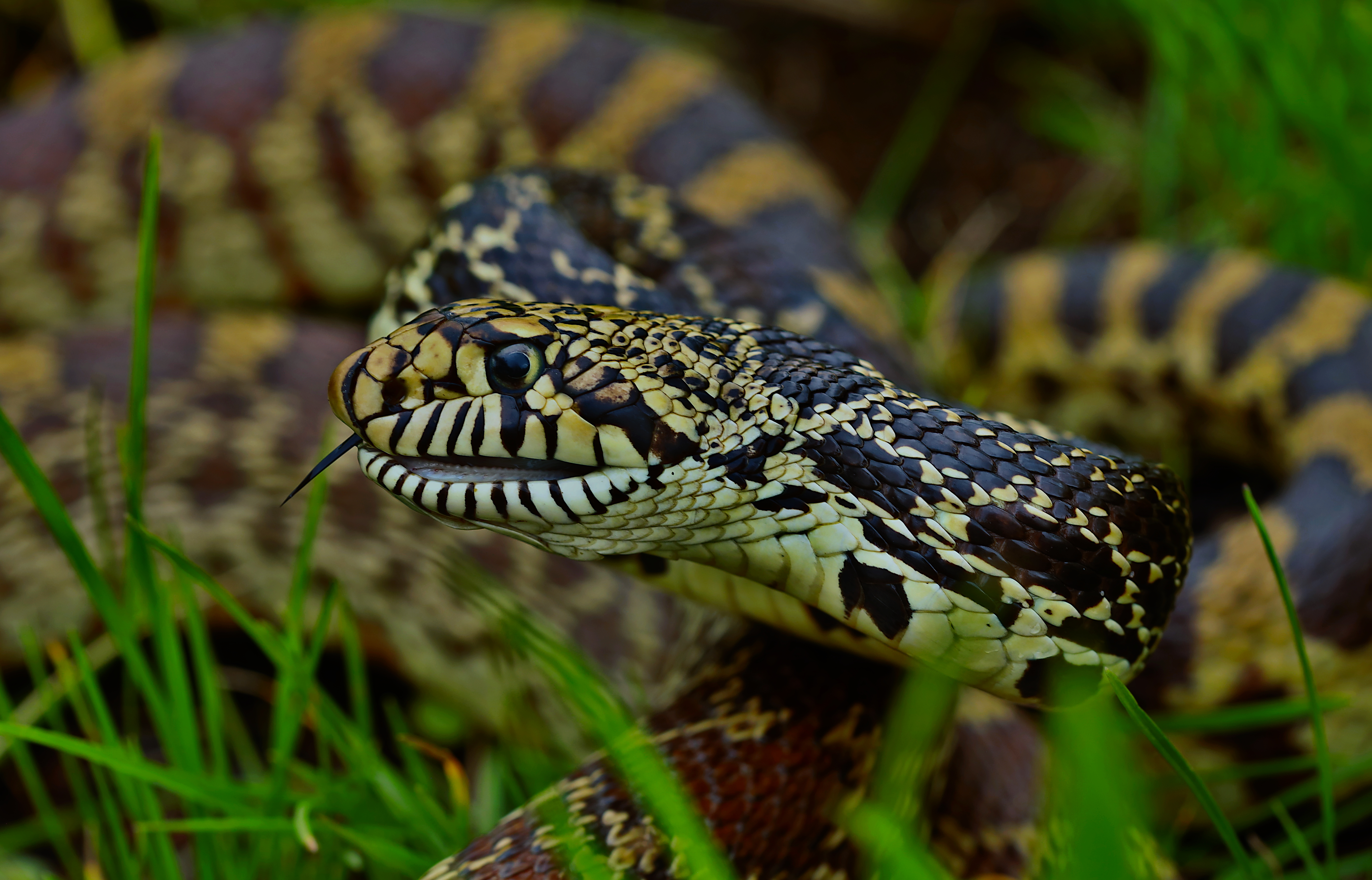
Closeup of the head of a bullsnake (P. c. sayi), Clark County, Missouri

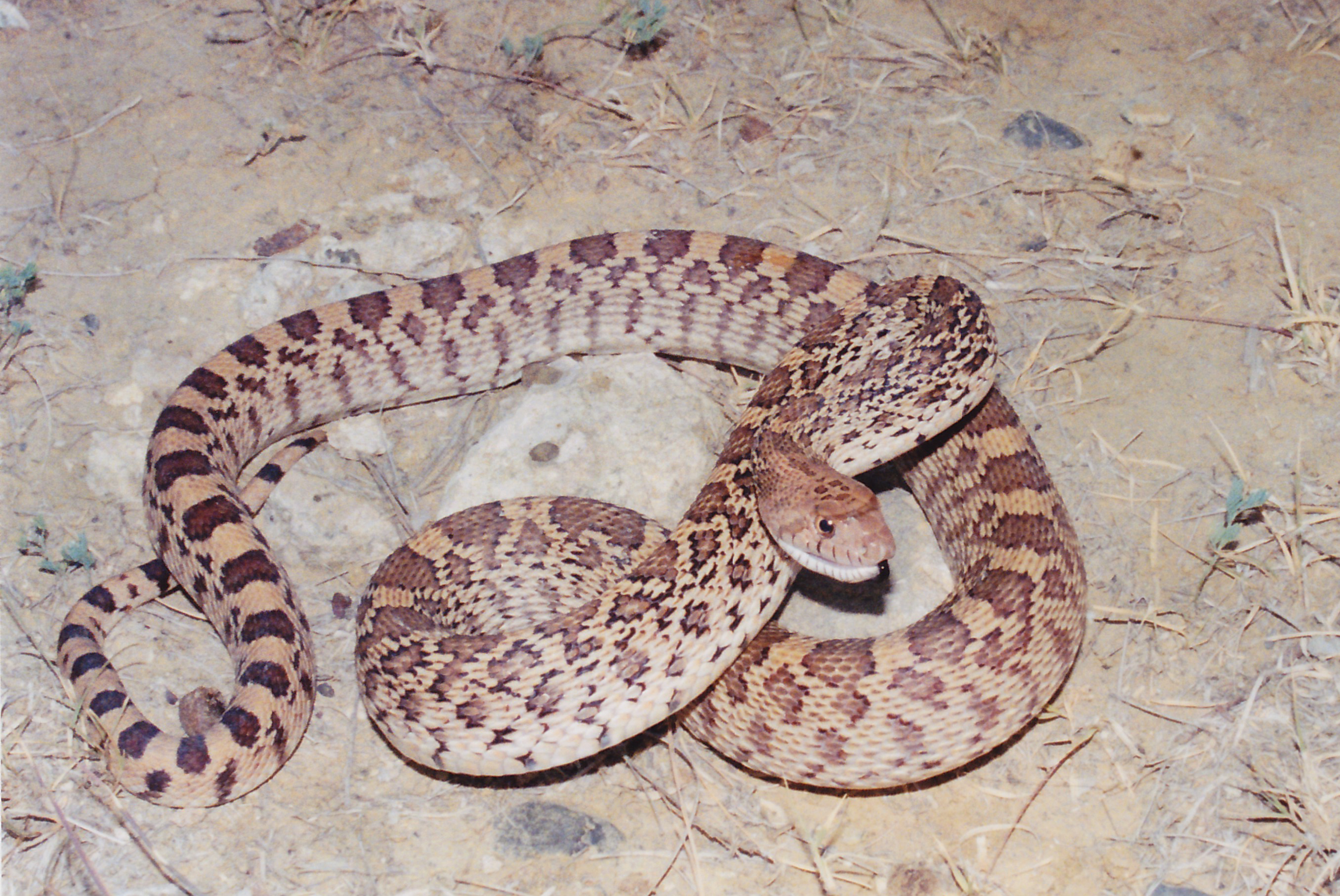
Bullsnake (P. c. sayi), Municipality of Camargo, Tamaulipas, Mexico

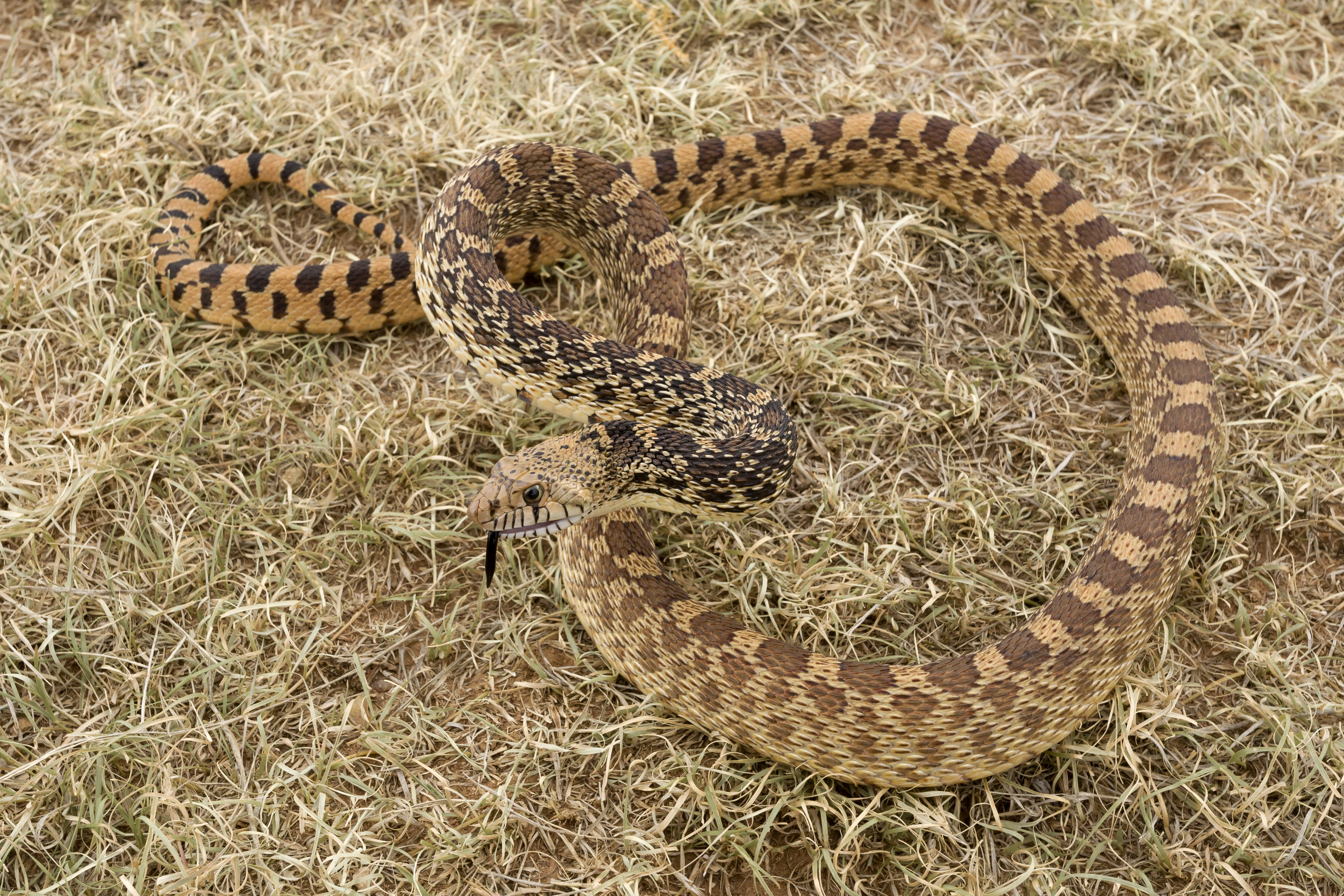
Bullsnake (P. c. sayi), Curry County, New Mexico

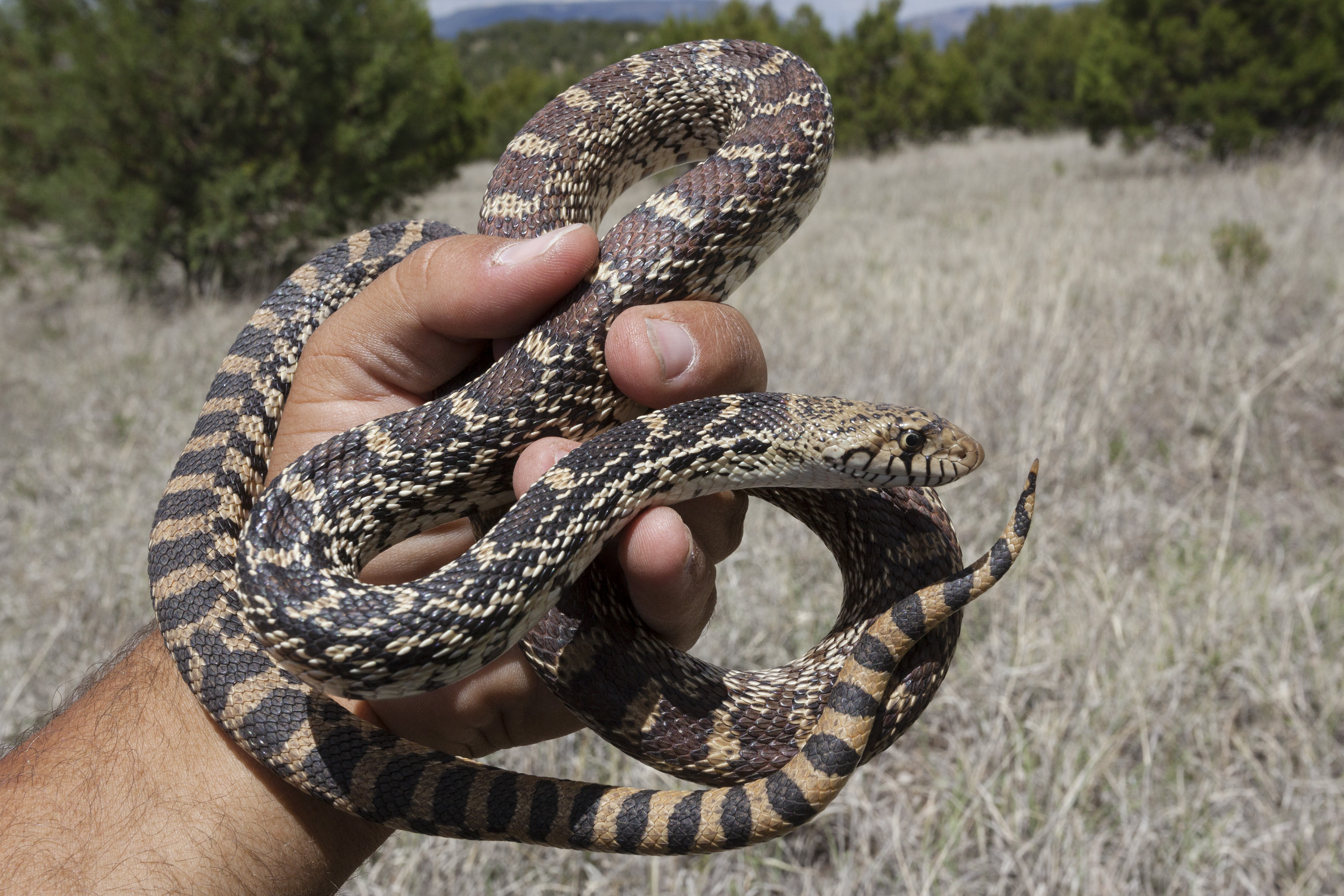
A P. catenifer from Lincoln County, New Mexico, in the vicinity of the integration zone between P. c. sayi and P. c. affinis.
