= Pituophis insulanus =

Conservation status
- Least Concern (IUCN 3.1)

Scientific classification
- Kingdom: Animalia
- Phylum: Chordata
- Class: Reptilia
- Order: Squamata
- Suborder: Serpentes
- Family: Colubridae
- Genus: Pituophis
- Species: P. insulanus

Binomial name
- Pituophis insulanus Klauber, 1946

Species of snake

Pituophis insulanus, the Cedros Island gopher snake, is a species of snake of the family Colubridae.

The snake is found in Mexico.
