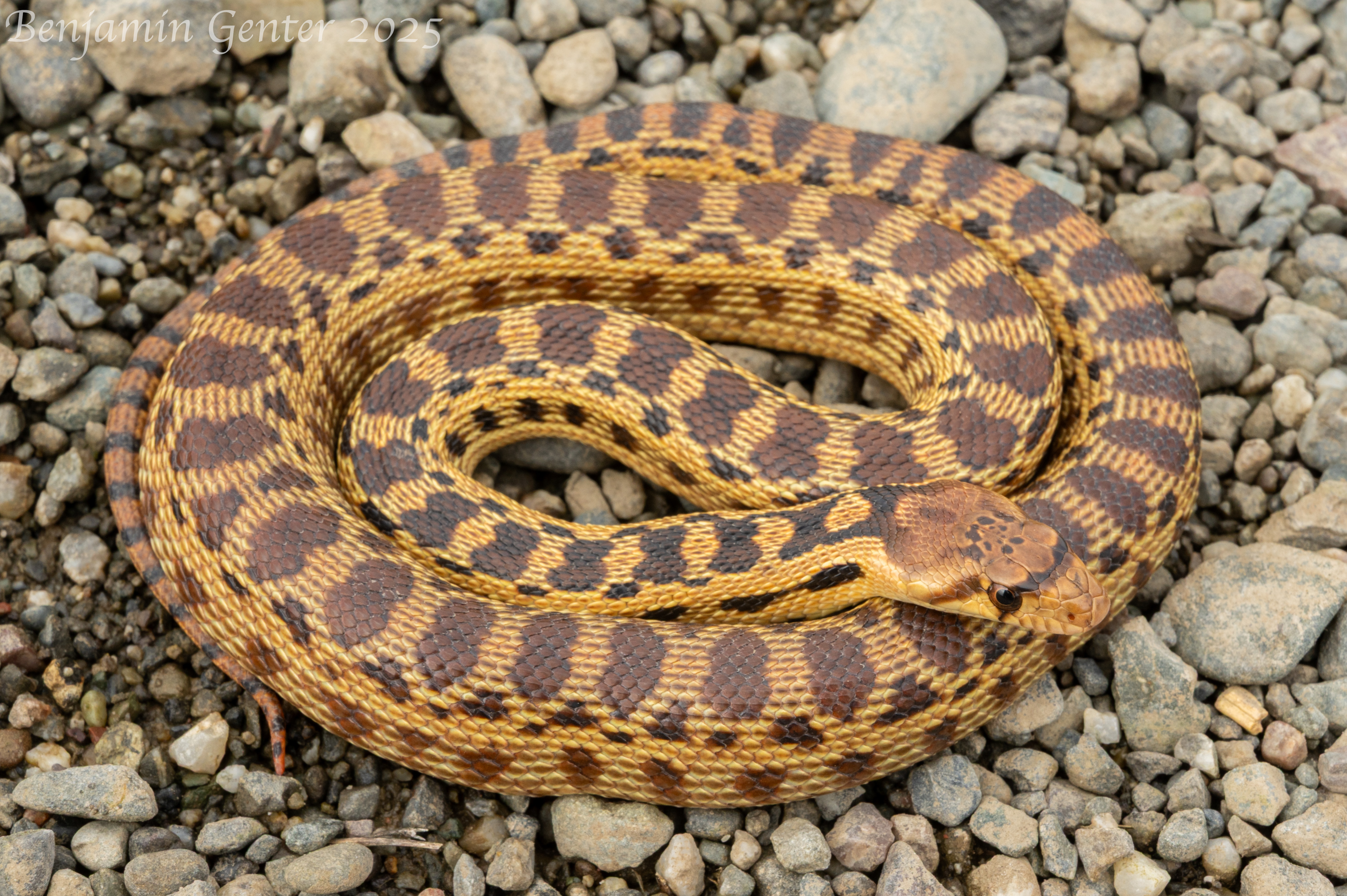

Conservation status
- Least Concern (IUCN 3.1)

Scientific classification
- Kingdom: Animalia
- Phylum: Chordata
- Class: Reptilia
- Order: Squamata
- Suborder: Serpentes
- Family: Colubridae
- Genus: Pituophis
- Species: P. catenifer

Binomial name
- Pituophis catenifer (Blainville, 1835)
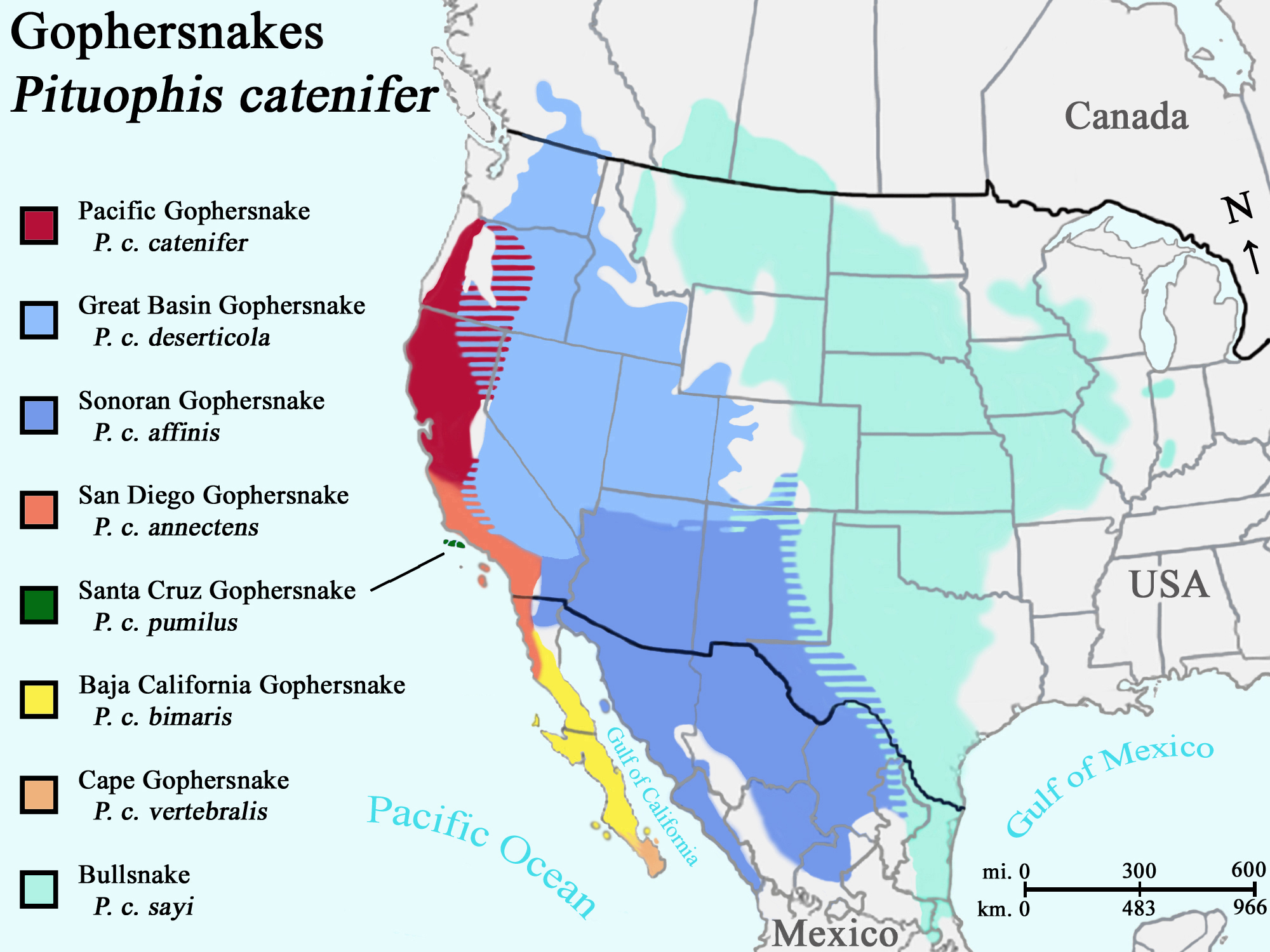

Synonyms Common names: Pacific gopher snake, coast gopher snake, western gopher snake (more here).
- Coluber catenifer Blainville, 1835; Pituophis catenifer — Baird & Girard, 1853; Pityophis heermanni Hallowell, 1853; Elaphis reticulatus A.M.C. Duméril & Bibron, 1854; Pityophis hæmatois Cope, 1860; Coluber catenifer — Boulenger, 1894; Pituophis catenifer — Stejneger & Barbour, 1917

= Pituophis catenifer =

Species of snake

Pituophis catenifer, the gopher snake, is a species of nonvenomous colubrid snake endemic to North America. Nine subspecies are currently recognized.

== Etymology ==
The specific name, catenifer, is Latin for "chain-bearing", referring to the dorsal color pattern.

== Description ==
Adult gopher snakes are typically 36-84 in (91–213 cm) in length, when fully mature. Dorsally, gopher snakes are yellowish or a light, sandy brown, with a series of large, dark brown or black markings and smaller, darker spots along the sides. Ventrally, they are a lighter yellowish, either uniformly or with brown markings. They also come in several morphs, depending on the subspecies.

This snake is often mistaken for the prairie rattlesnake (Crotalus viridus), but can be easily distinguished from a rattlesnake by the lack of a tail rattle, no black-and-white banding on its tail, and the shape of its head, which is narrower than a rattlesnake's. Additionally, rattlesnakes (and indeed most vipers) possess a large venom gland located behind each eye, giving their heads a much rounder, more angular shape, as opposed to the more cylindrical, slender head shape of a gopher snake or other colubrid.

== Behavior ==
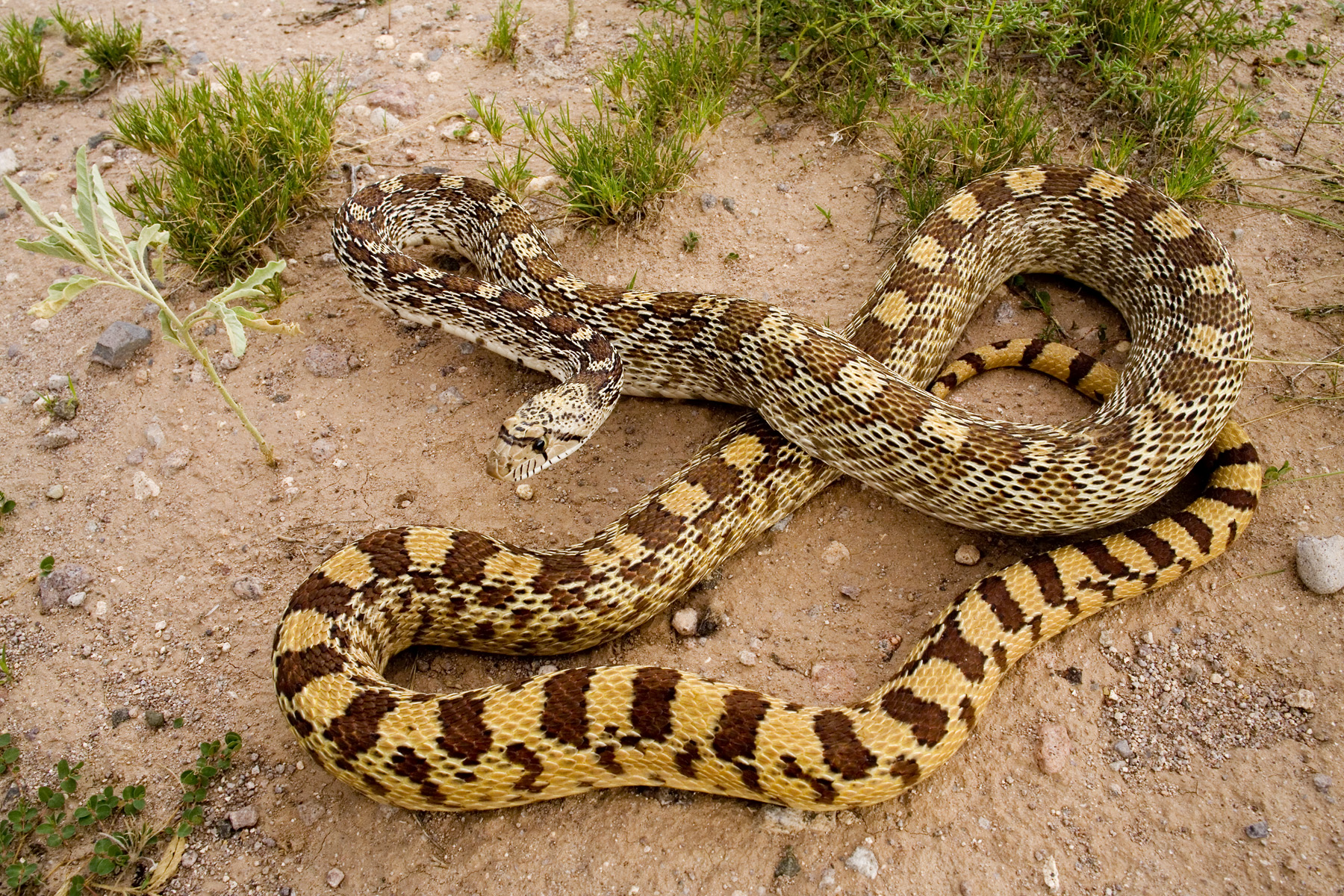
Sonoran gophersnake (Pituophis catenifer affinis), Doña Ana County, New Mexico (August 17, 2010)

The gopher snake has a unique defensive mechanism, in which it puffs up its body and curls itself into the classic strike pose of a rattlesnake, but rather than delivering an open-mouthed strike, the gopher snake often strikes with a closed mouth, using its blunt nose to warn off possible predators. Additionally, gopher snakes vibrate their tails in a manner similar to rattlesnakes. One paper found that gopher snakes on islands lacking rattlesnakes vibrate their tails for shorter times than gopher snakes in mainland California, which is home to numerous rattlesnake species. This suggests that gopher snake-tail vibration may in fact be rattlesnake mimicry, since the behavior appears to be breaking down in areas without rattlesnakes, perhaps because predators on these islands have no reason to evolve to avoid tail-vibrating snakes (rattlesnakes are venomous, gopher snakes are not).

== Life expectancy ==
Wild gopher snakes typically live 12 to 15 years, but the oldest captive recorded lived over 33 years.

== Common names ==
Common names for this species, or its several subspecies, are: Pacific gopher snake, Henry snake, coast gopher snake, bullsnake, Churchill's bullsnake, Oregon bullsnake, Pacific pine snake, western bullsnake, western gopher snake, Sonoran gopher snake, western pine snake, great basin gopher snake, blow snake, and yellow gopher snake.

== Subspecies ==
As of 2022, nearly unanimous agreement exists on the recognition of six subspecies, occurring from southern Canada, the continental United States, and Mexico. However, no full agreement is found among taxonomists on the status of populations from Baja California and some offshore islands; the Cape gopher snake (Pituophis catenifer vertebralis) and central Baja Californian gopher snake (P. catenifer bimaris) are recognized, by some sources, as a single species (with no subspecies vertebralis). Some other sources, alternatively, consider it a species with two subspecies: P. v. vertebralis and P. v. bimaris. Other subspecies, including the Coronado Island gopher snake (P. catenifer coronalis) and San Martin Island gopher snake (P. catenifer fulginatus) are of questionable validity.

Standardized English name, subspecies, and author	Geographic range
Sonoran gopher snake Pituophis catenifer affinis Hallowell, 1852	American S.W., including extreme S.E. California, Arizona, New Mexico, Trans-Pecos Texas, and N.W. Mexico (incl. extreme N.E. Baja California, Sonora, Chihuahua, Coahuila, Nuevo León, Sinaloa, E. Durango, N. Zacatecas, and extreme west San Luis Potosí (the Chihuahuan and Sonora Deserts).
San Diego gopher snake Pituophis catenifer annectens Baird & Girard, 1853	S.W. California (San Diego and Orange Counties) and N.W. Baja California state.
Pacific gopher snake Pituophis catenifer catenifer (Blainville, 1835)	From Oregon (west of the Cascade Range) and south into California, west of the Sierra Nevada (south to northern Santa Barbara County and the Tehachapi Mountains).
Great Basin gopher snake P. c. deserticola Stejneger, 1893	South-central British Columbia, E. Washington, E. Oregon, S.W. Idaho, S.W. Wyoming, Nevada, Utah, west Colorado, parts of S.E. California, N. Arizona and extreme N.W. New Mexico (Great Basin and Mojave Desert).
San Martin Island gopher snake Pituophis catenifer fulginatus Klauber, 1946	San Martin Island, Baja California.
Santa Cruz Island gopher snake Pituophis catenifer pumilis Klauber, 1946	Santa Cruz Island, Santa Rosa Island, and San Miguel Island, in the California Channel Islands.
Bullsnake Pituophis catenifer sayi (Schlegel, 1837)	Southern Alberta and Saskatchewan; central U.S.—including east Colorado, Illinois, extreme northwest Indiana, Iowa, Kansas, Minnesota, Missouri, Montana, Nebraska, eastern New Mexico, southwest North Dakota, Oklahoma, South Dakota, Texas, southwest Wisconsin, eastern Wyoming; Northern Mexico—including northeast Nuevo León, Tamaulipas, extreme southeastern San Luis Potosí, and extreme northern Veracruz (Great Plains and Midwestern United States).

== Gallery ==
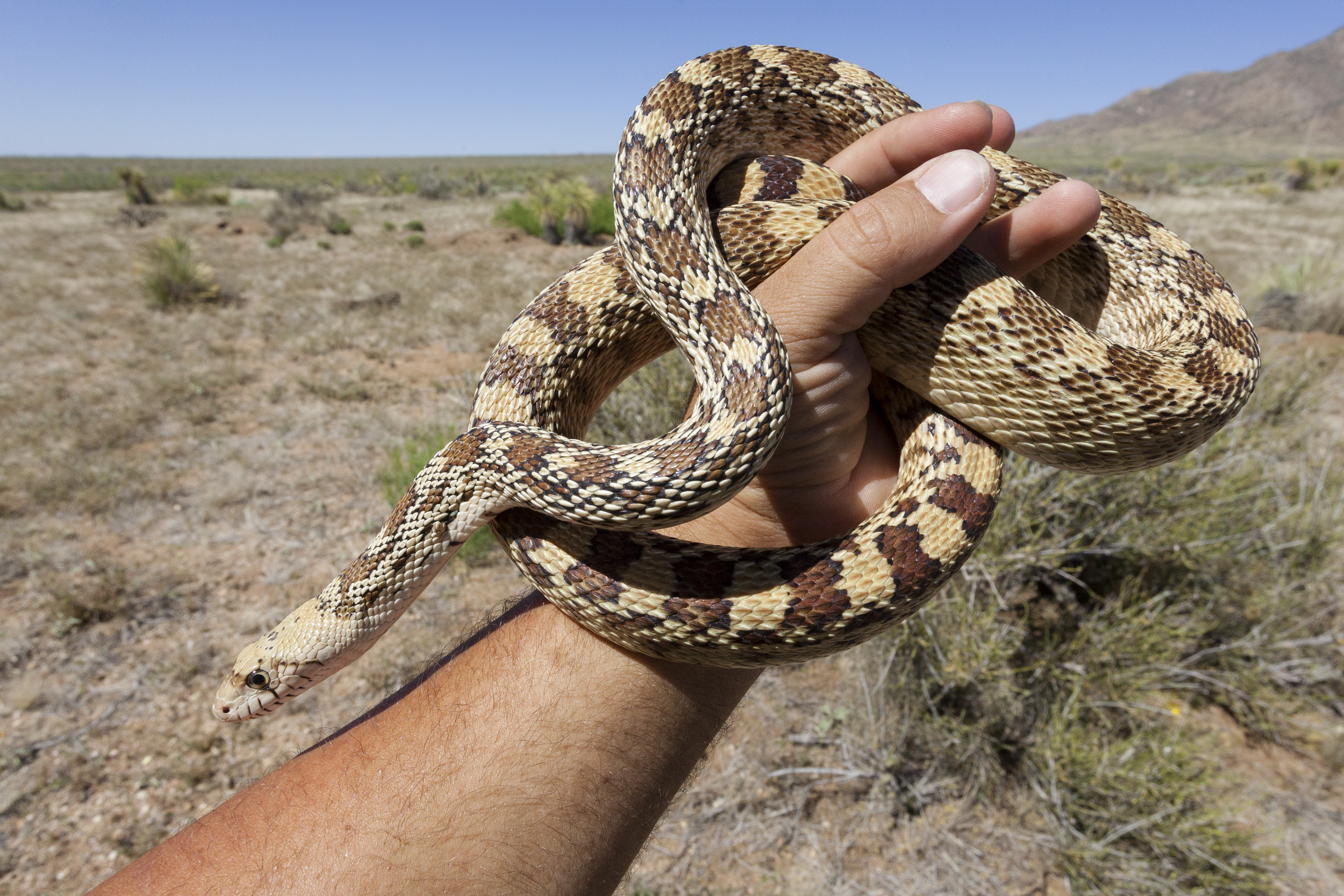
Sonoran gopher snake (Pituophis catenifer affinis) Hidalgo County, New Mexico (18 April 2017)

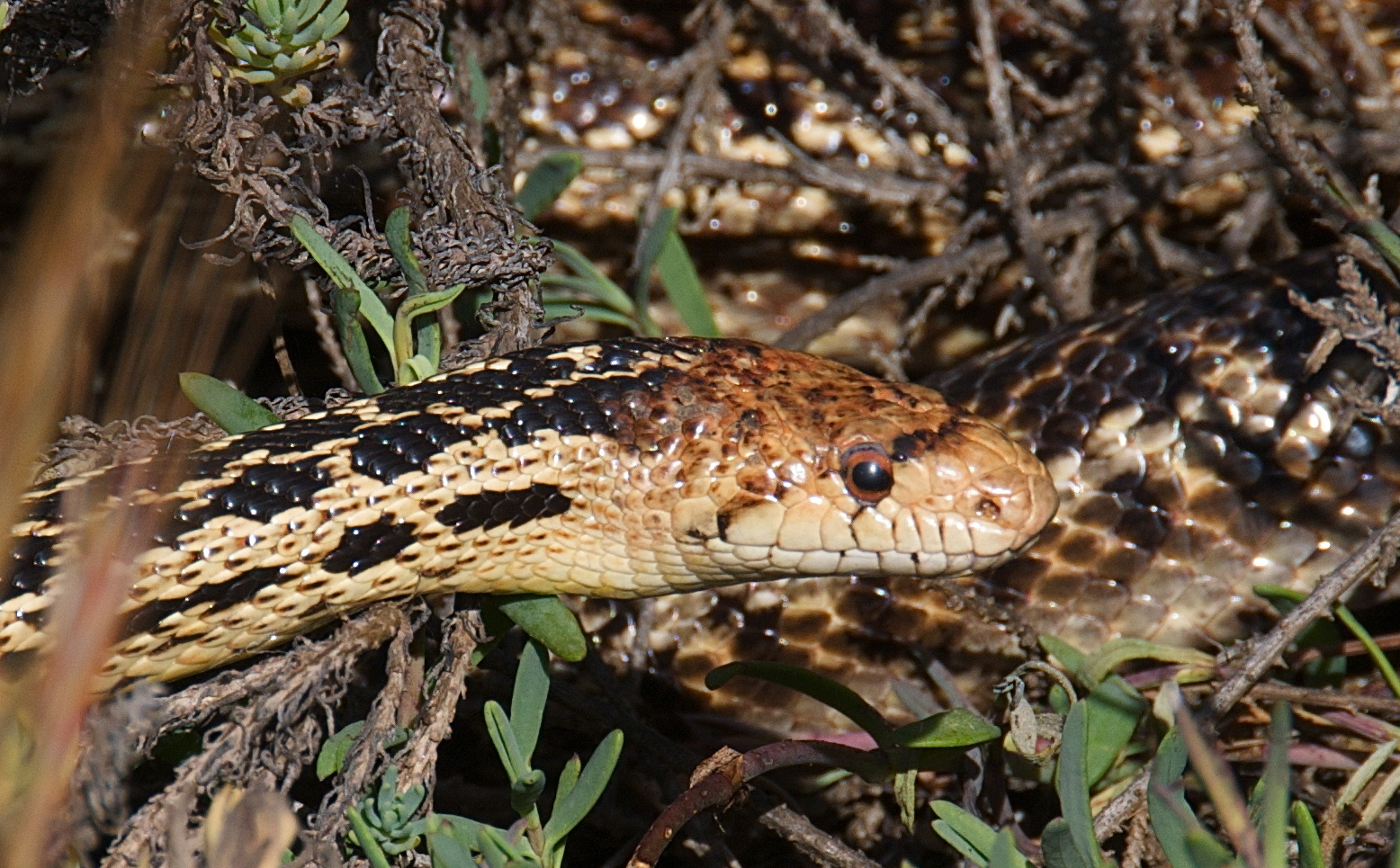
San Diego gopher snake (Pituophis catenifer annectens) San Luis Obispo County, California (May 9, 2009)

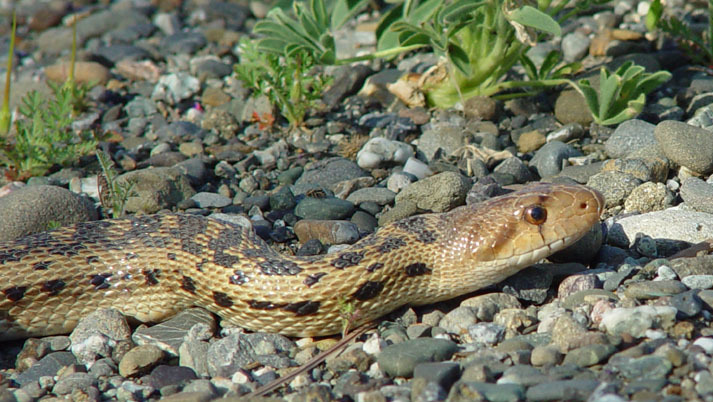
Pacific gopher snake (Pituophis catenifer catenifer), Alpine County, California (March 27, 2004)

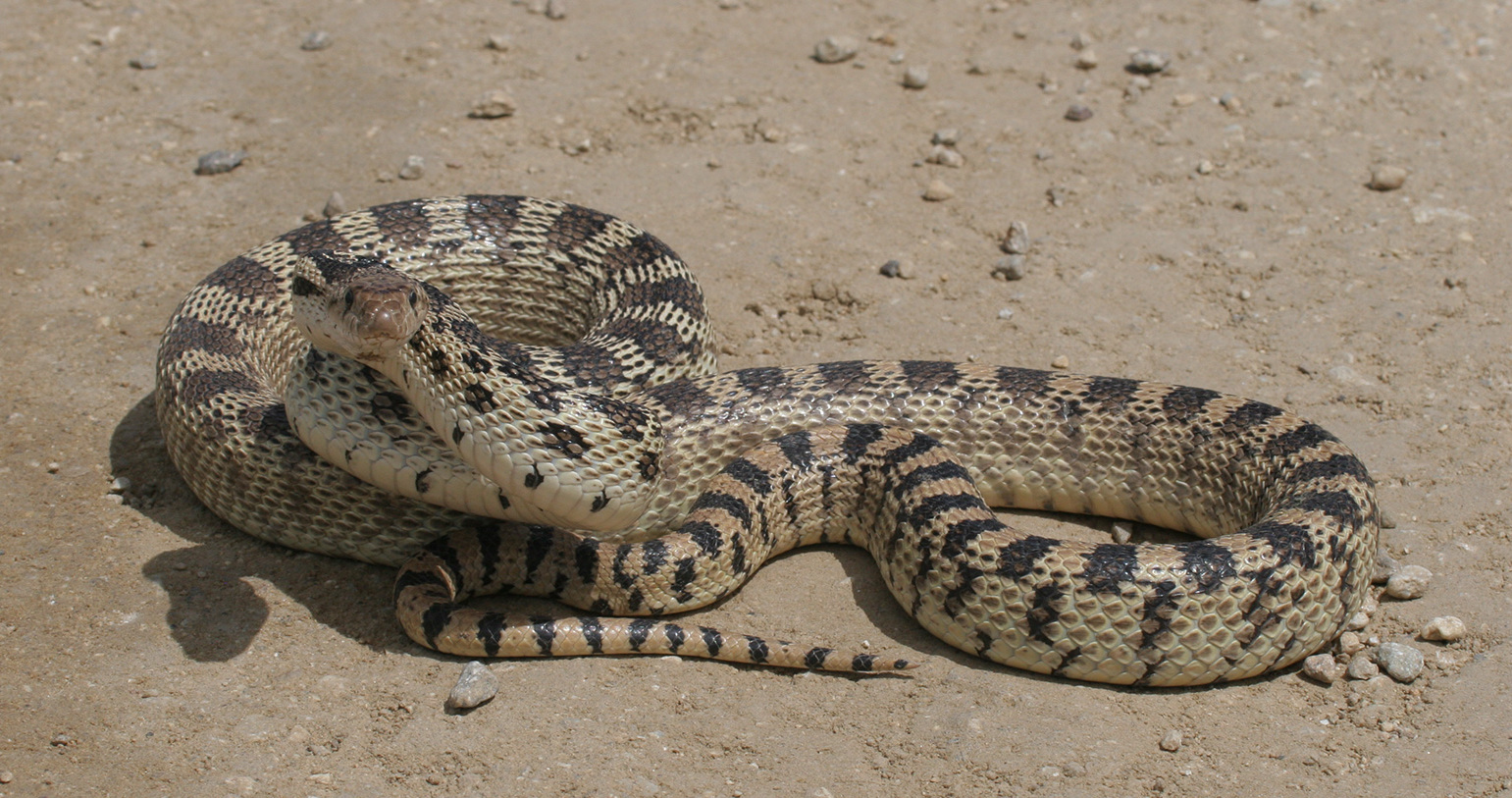
Great Basin gophersnake (Pituophis catenifer deserticola), Elko County, Nevada (May 25, 2006)

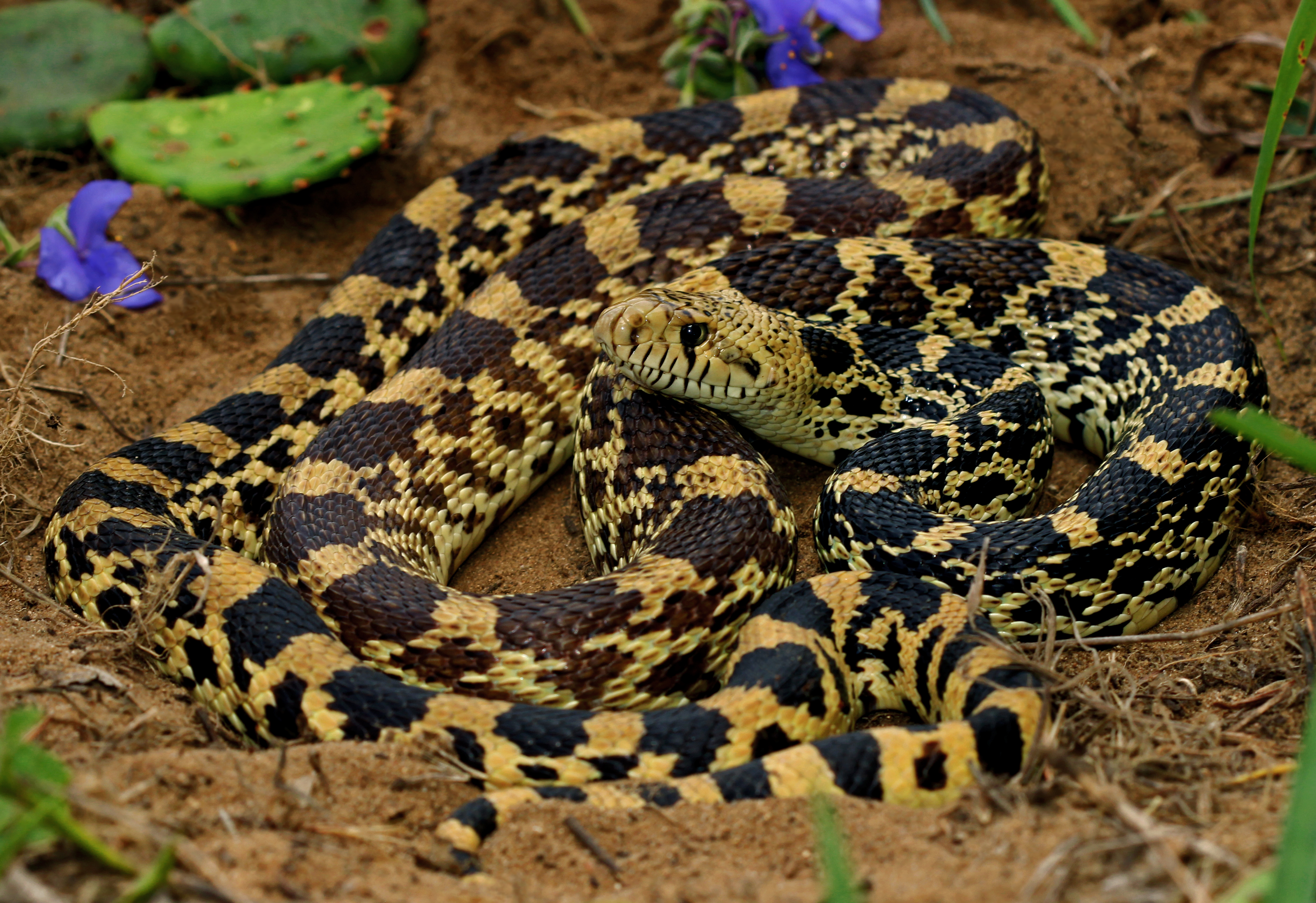
Bullsnake (Pituophis catenifer sayi), Mason County, Illinois (June 13, 2018)
