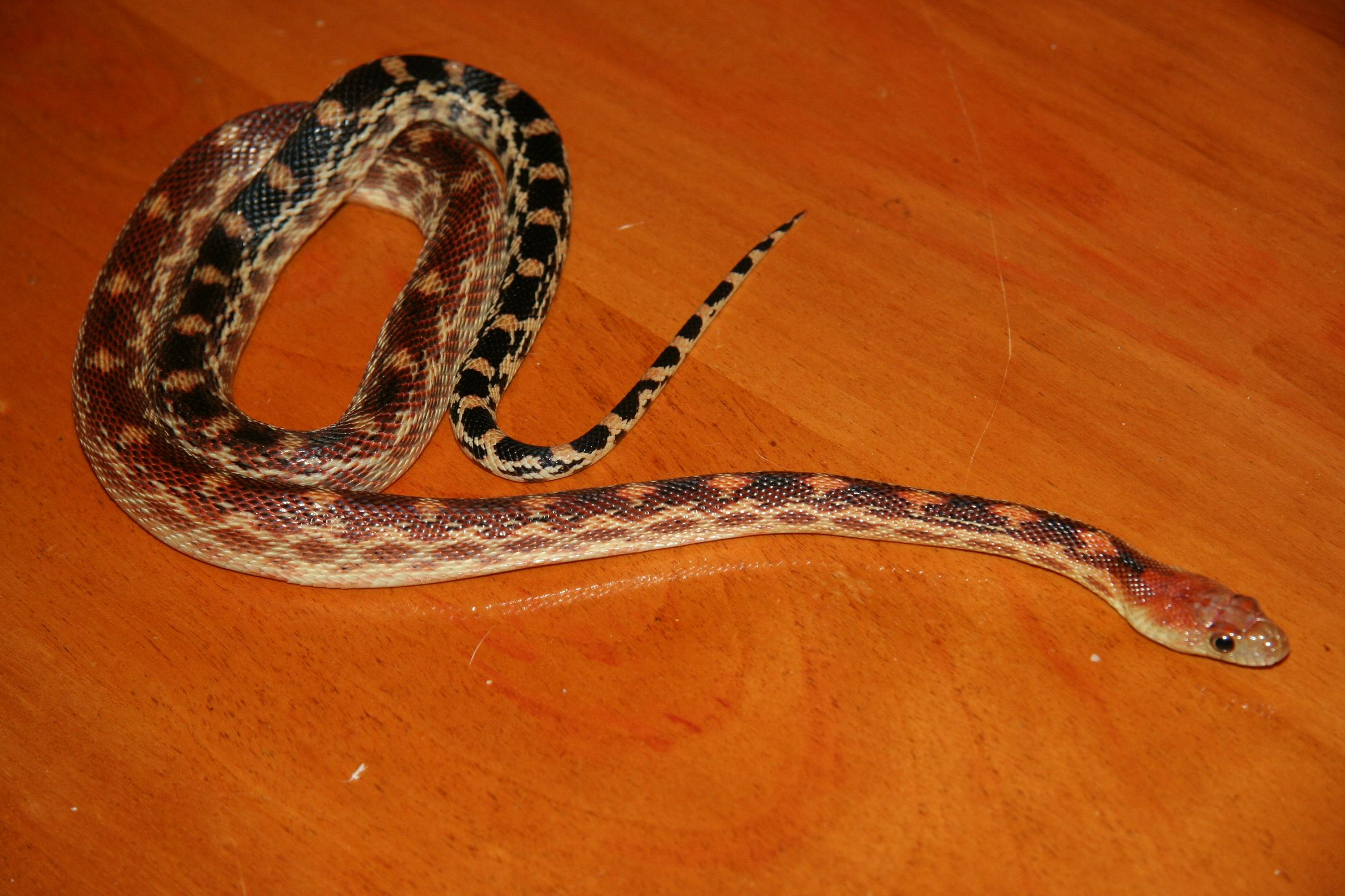

Conservation status
- Least Concern (IUCN 3.1)

Scientific classification
- Kingdom: Animalia
- Phylum: Chordata
- Class: Reptilia
- Order: Squamata
- Suborder: Serpentes
- Family: Colubridae
- Genus: Pituophis
- Species: P. vertebralis

Binomial name
- Pituophis vertebralis (Blainville, 1835)

Synonyms
- Coluber vertebralis Blainville, 1835; Rhinechis vertebralis — A.M.C. Duméril, 1853; Pituophis vertebralis — A.M.C. Duméril & Bibron, 1854; Pituophis catenifer vertebralis — Garman, 1884; Pityophis vertebralis — Cope, 1900; Pituophis vertebralis — Stejneger & Barbour, 1917; Pituophis catenifer vertebralis — Hirschkorn & Skubowius, 2011

= Cape gopher snake =

Cape and Baja gopher snake

Species of snake

The Cape gopher snake or Baja gopher snake (Pituophis vertebralis) is a species of nonvenomous colubrid snake endemic to extreme southern Baja California Sur, Mexico. They have become increasingly popular companions for people interested in the exotic pet trade, due to their extreme color variations and relatively docile behavior. It was previously considered to be a subspecies of Pituophis catenifer. There has been controversy whether the Baja Gopher Snake is a lower classification of the Cape Gopher Snake. Some say the Baja Gopher Snake should be in a separate sub-species of Pituophis Vertebralis Bimaris, while Cape Gopher Snakes should remain Pituophis Vertebralis Vertebralis. Many people mistake the two as the same sub species and have cased some cross-breeding between the two. In captivity the bloodlines are nearly all related and breeding has become especially difficult in terms of keeping the bloodlines alive.

== Description ==
The Cape gopher snake is named after the location of its natural habitat, the Baja California Peninsula. Here, the snake can only be found at high elevations on the southern tip of the peninsula, where temperatures usually remain a mild 78 °F (25.5 °C). Hobbyists who own a Cape gopher snake commonly assume that the snake's natural habitat is significantly warmer, then proceed to create a dangerously hot environment. This lack of understanding is presumably due to the snake's rarity.

A single Cape gopher snake can exhibit wild color and pattern variations along the length of its body. Most begin with bright H-shaped marks in differing orange shades against an intense yellow background. As the patterns ae traced down toward the tip of the tail, they begin to change in shape and darken until they are completely black, while the yellow background loses its intensity. Other Cape gopher snakes' patterns begin as black stripes before evenly transforming into the familiar marks of the P. vertebralis species. When the snake is coiled up and alone, some people may mistake the differing colors and patterns for several snakes.

The typical total length of an adult Cape gopher snake ranges from 36 to 66 in (91.5–168 cm). Hatchlings are born at 12–18 in (30–48 cm) in total length. When threatened, the snake flattens its head while simultaneously vibrating its tail and hissing, closely imitating a rattlesnake.

== Habitat ==
Most information gathered about the location of Cape gopher snakes is anecdotal, but the area where they range is incredibly diverse. Dominating the landscape is a Sonoran-like desert fraught with cacti, but includes dry tropical forests, arid tropical scrubs, desert shores, and the Sierra de la Laguna, an area designated by UNESCO as a global biosphere reserve because the "semiarid to temperate subhumid climate area represents highly important and contrasted ecosystems." This area is known to go months, even years, without rainfall, yet can be saturated with the flood waters of a tropical storm or hurricane in a span of just one week.

== Behavior ==
Young Cape gopher snakes are aggressive and very easily agitated. Their temperament varies with each individual snake, but a young one uncommonly strikes frequently at anything that moves. This aggressive behavior does not last long. Once they pass this phase, they are notably more docile and rarely (if ever) strike at anything (food is an exception). Still, Cape gopher snakes have a reputation for being nervous when handled. They remain still, but inevitably become active again and squirm before suddenly calming and starting the cycle over.

== Prey ==
The Cape gopher snake's prey is thought to include many small rodents, birds and eggs, though no certainty exists, due to a lack of research of these snakes in the wild. In captivity, small rodents and eggs suffice.
