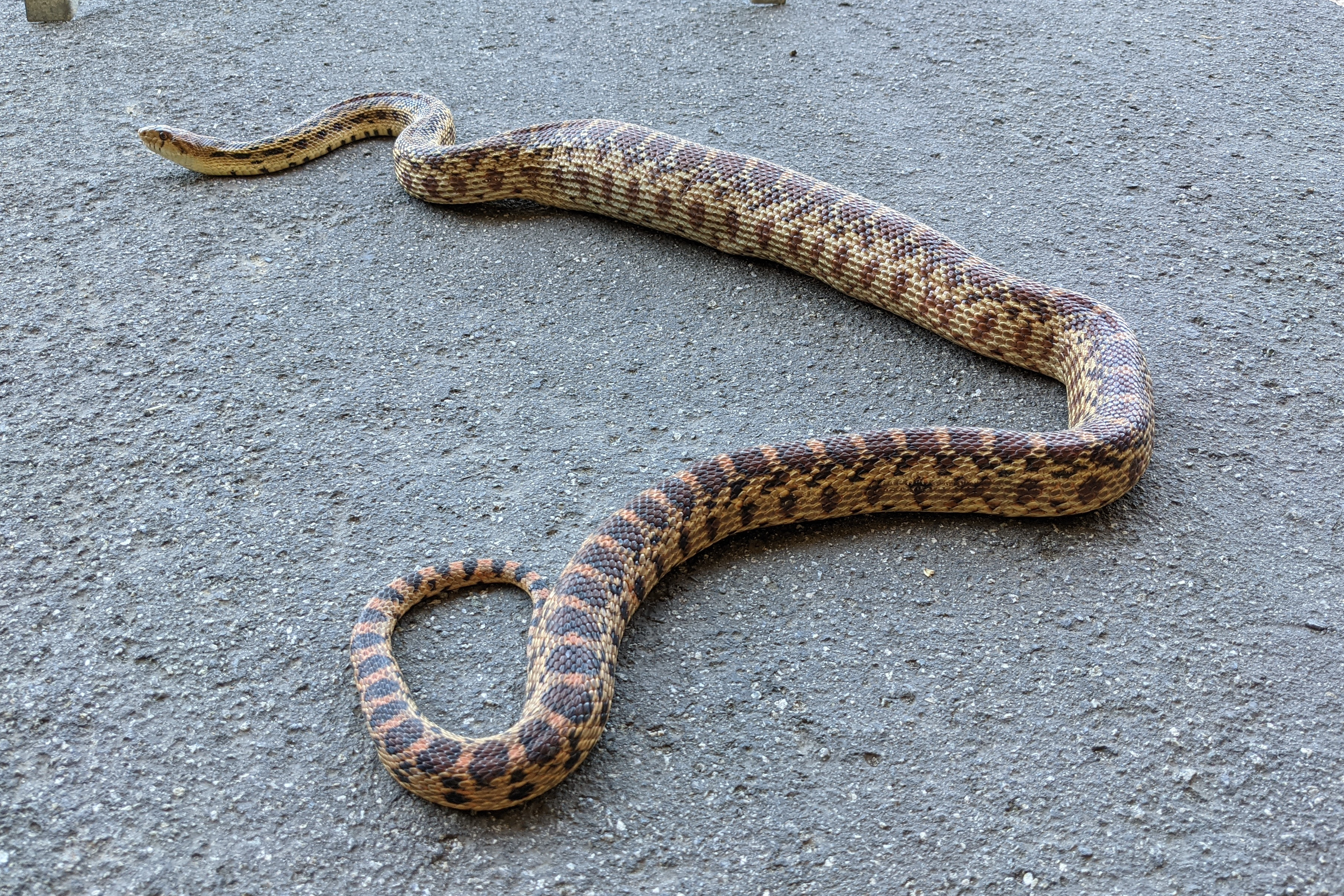
- Pacific gopher snake Pituophis catenifer catenifer

Scientific classification
- Kingdom: Animalia
- Phylum: Chordata
- Class: Reptilia
- Order: Squamata
- Suborder: Serpentes
- Family: Colubridae
- Tribe: Lampropeltini
- Genus: Pituophis; Holbrook, 1842

Synonyms
- Churchilla, Elaphis, Epiglottophis, Pityophis, Rhinechis

= Pituophis =

Genus of snakes

Pituophis is a genus of nonvenomous colubrid snakes, commonly referred to as gopher snakes, pine snakes, and bullsnakes, which are endemic to North America. They are often yellow or cream in color with dark spots and a dark line across their face. Some species can exceed seven feet in length. Gopher snakes can live for 15 years. The gopher snake is commonly misidentified as a rattlesnake because of its similar coloration and its defensive behavior when feeling threatened. A scared gopher snake will flatten its head, hiss loudly, and shake its tail rapidly, doing a very convincing rattlesnake imitation.

== Nomenclature ==
The genus name Pituophis is a Latinized modern scientific Greek compound Πιτυόφις : "pine snake"; from Ancient Greek: πίτυς (pítus, "pine"), and Ancient Greek: ὄφις (óphis, "snake").

== Geographic range ==
Species and subspecies within the genus Pituophis are found throughout Mexico, the Southern and Western United States and Western Canada.

== Description ==
All species of Pituophis are large and powerfully built. The head is relatively small in proportion to the body and it is only slightly distinct from the neck. The rostral is enlarged and elongated, imparting a characteristic somewhat pointed shape to the head. All the species occurring in the United States have four prefrontals instead of the usual two.

== Modified epiglottis ==
In all snakes of the genus Pituophis, the epiglottis is peculiarly modified so that it is thin, erect and flexible. When a stream of air is forced from the trachea, the epiglottis vibrates, thereby producing the peculiarly loud, hoarse hissing for which bullsnakes, gopher snakes, and pine snakes are well known.

== Species and subspecies ==
Image	Scientific name	Common name	Subspecies	Distribution
	Pituophis catenifer (Blainville, 1835)	gopher snake	P. c. affinis (Hallowell, 1852) – Sonoran gopher snake; P. c. annectens Baird & Girard, 1853 – San Diego gopher snake; P. c. bimaris Klauber, 1946 – central Baja California gopher snake; P. c. catenifer (Blainville, 1835) – Pacific gopher snake; P. c. coronalis Klauber, 1946 – Coronado Island gopher snake; P. c. deserticola Stejneger, 1893 – Great Basin gopher snake; P. c. fulginatus Klauber, 1946 – San Martin Island gopher snake; P. c. pumilis Klauber, 1946 – Santa Cruz Island gopher snake; P. c. sayi (Schlegel, 1837) – bullsnake	North America
	Pituophis deppei (A.M.C. Duméril, 1853)	Mexican bullsnake	P. d. deppei (A.M.C. Duméril, 1853) – southern Mexican pine snake; P. d. jani (Cope, 1861) – northern Mexican pine snake	central, Mexico
	Pituophis insulanus Klauber, 1946	Cedros Island gopher snake		Isla de Cedros, Mexico
	Pituophis lineaticollis (Cope, 1861)	Middle American gopher snake	P. l. gibsoni Stuart, 1954; P. l. lineaticollis (Cope, 1861)	From Mexico city, south through Mexico and to Guatemala
	Pituophis melanoleucus (Daudin, 1803)	pine snake	P. m. lodingi Blanchard, 1924 – black pine snake; P. m. melanoleucus (Daudin, 1803) – northern pine snake; P. m. mugitus Barbour, 1921 – Florida pine snake	southeastern United States
	Pituophis ruthveni Stull, 1929	Louisiana pine snake		west-central Louisiana and East Texas
	Pituophis vertebralis (Blainville, 1835)	Cape gopher snake		southern Baja California Sur, Mexico.
