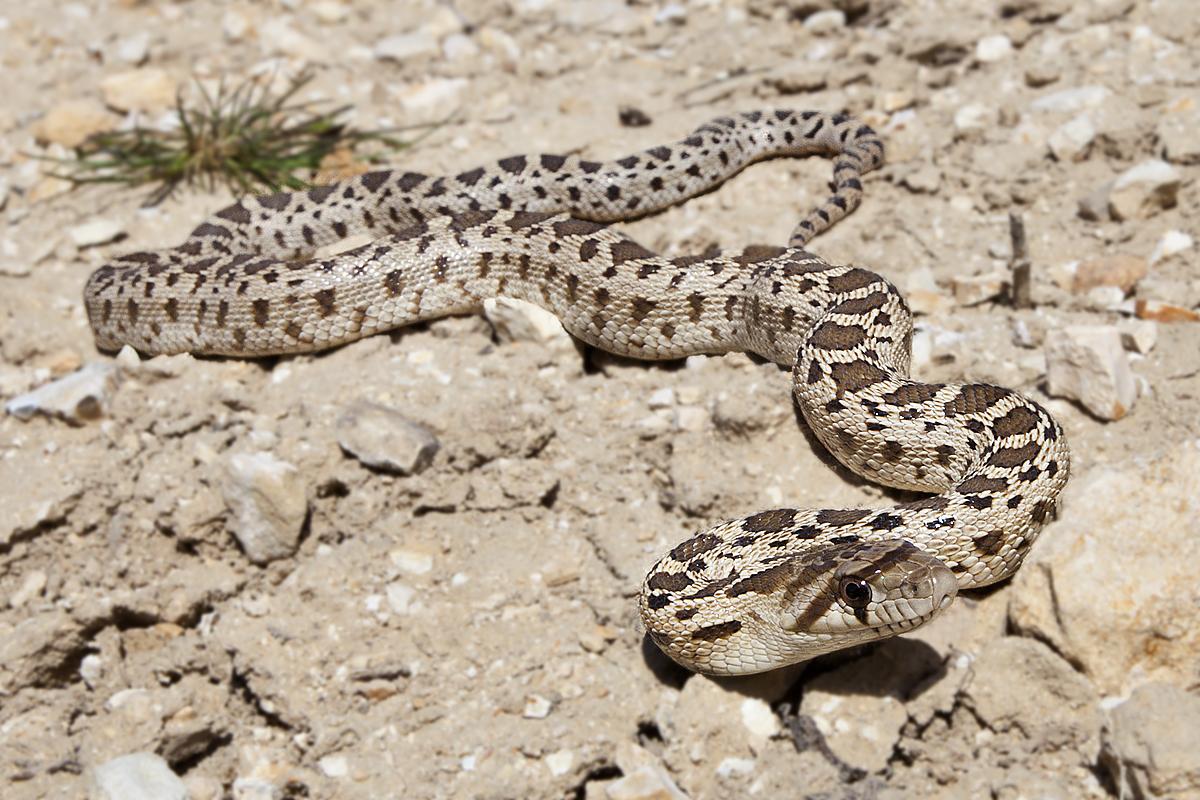

Scientific classification
- Kingdom: Animalia
- Phylum: Chordata
- Class: Reptilia
- Order: Squamata
- Suborder: Serpentes
- Family: Colubridae
- Genus: Pituophis
- Species: P. catenifer
- Subspecies: P. c. catenifer

Trinomial name
- Pituophis catenifer catenifer (Blainville, 1835)

Synonyms
- Coluber catenifer Blainville, 1835; Pituophis catenifer — Baird & Girard, 1853; Pityophis catenifer — Cope, 1900; Pituophis catenifer catenifer — Stejneger & Barbour, 1917

= Pacific gopher snake =

Subspecies of snake

Pituophis catenifer catenifer is a subspecies of large non-venomous colubrid snake native to the western coast of North America. Pacific gopher snakes are one of California's most common snake species. They often get confused for rattlesnakes because they mimic similar patterns and defense mechanisms. As a result, gopher snakes can often avoid confrontation without needing to rely on their non-venomous nature for survival.

== Description ==
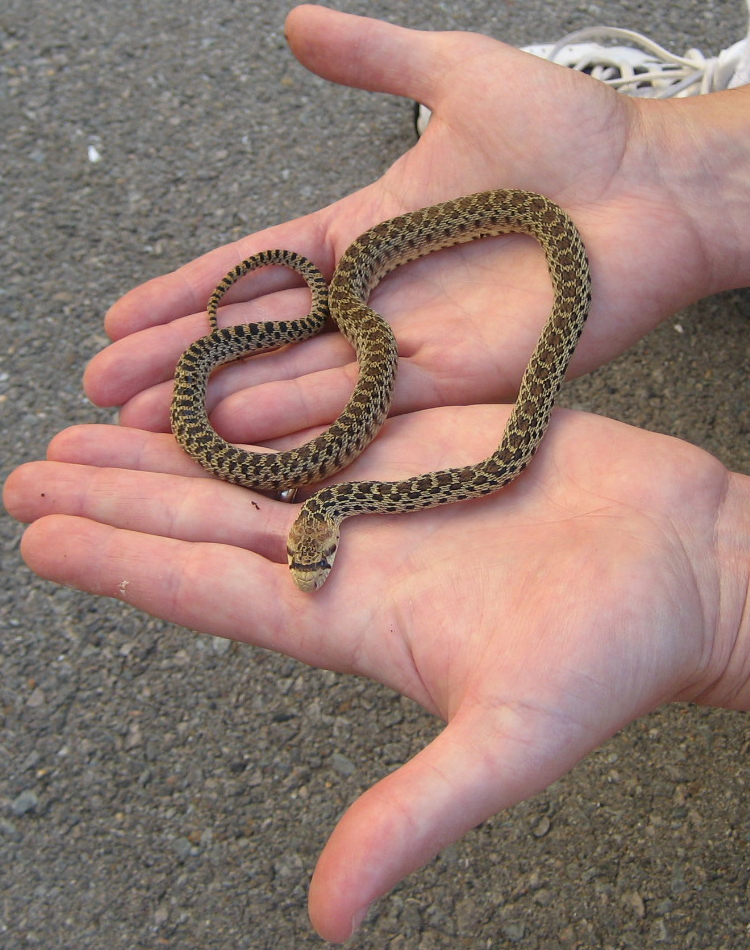
The size of this juvenile Pacific gopher snake is shown by comparison with the hands holding it

Pacific gopher snake adults range in size from 3–7 ft (0.91–2.13 m) in total length. However, most of the subspecies reach a length of 4–5 ft (1.2–1.5 m). The hatchlings are relatively long, and they have been recorded at lengths upward of 20 in (510 mm).

The Pacific gopher snake has a base color ranging from yellow to dark brown and has a gray coloring on the sides of the body. It is a spotted snake, with the spots being dark brown. Usually there are 41 to 99 spots on the body, while the tail spots range from 14 to 33. The side of the body has 2 or 3 rows of alternating black and brown spots.

A snake with keeled scales, and a narrow head that is wider than the neck, the Pacific gopher snake also displays a protruding rostral scale on the tip of the snout. The two most common base colors are straw and straw gray, though the species' color varies widely. The dorsal blotches, or saddles, are well-defined and generally dark to chocolate brown, though some specimens have had black blotches. The side blotches are often brown or gray. The back of the neck is dark brown. In many areas, such as Solano County, California, the snake can be found in a striped morph.

The ventral side may be cream-colored to yellowish with dark spots. On the dorsal side, especially near the tail, there is often a reddish coloration.

== Identification ==
As aforementioned, there are two to three rows of spots on the side of the Pacific gopher snake. However, the San Diego gopher snake (P. c. annectens) has 3 to 4rows of smaller spots on its side. The Pacific gopher snake's saddle spots do not have the barren characteristic as those of the San Diego gopher snakes do. Also, the spots in the second row of spots are much larger on P. c. catenifer as compared to P. c. annectens. Finally, the Pacific gopher snake generally has more saddle spots than the San Diego gopher snake.

== Feeding behavior ==
The diet of pacific gopher snakes mainly consists of small rodents. They also consume birds, bird eggs, lizards, and occasionally insects or bats, depending on what is available in its habitat. The Pacific gopher snake is diurnal, hunting for prey during the day, however, it is sometimes seen out hunting in night time. It may also exhibit nocturnal behavior in warmer conditions. To hunt, they will enter underground burrows, perch on sites during the day, or strike unsuspecting prey resting at night, ultimately using constriction to immobilize and kill their prey. Its preference for agricultural fields and open spaces makes it an important natural pest controller in its ecosystem, helping manage rodent populations.

== Social behavior ==
Like other gopher snakes, the Pacific gopher snake can produce a loud hiss when agitated or fearful. When threatened, this species will inflate its body, flatten its head, and vigorously shake its tail, which may produce a rattling sound if done in dry vegetation. However, gopher snakes are non venomous, generally good natured, and not harmful to humans.

Pacific gopher snakes are typically non-social with other snakes, but will share communal hibernacula with other snakes during the winter.

== Predators ==
Foxes, badgers, red-tailed hawks, and coyotes are the typical predators of gopher snakes, as well as larger king snakes. Due to the color of their skin pattern, gopher snakes can seek camouflage in gardens and near rocks. However, gopher snakes have defense against predators in which they appear similar to other venomous or dominant snakes, such as vipers and rattlesnakes. These defenses consist of a viper's strike pose and a rattlesnake's tail shake that prevent predators from wanting to approach a venomous snake.

== Activity patterns ==
Pacific gopher snakes prefer warmer temperatures, ideally around 75 to 90 °F (24 to 32 °C), and drier habitats such as meadows, fields and agricultural farmlands. They are seldom found in dense forests or cold environments. To maintain warm internal temperatures, Pacific gopher snakes will often bask in sunlight on rocks. When temperatures heat up beyond the Pacific gopher snake's tolerance, they will seek cooler temperatures in burrows, leaf litter, shade, under rocks, or swim in small bodies of water. They will undergo periods of inactivity in the winter from November to March, often residing in abandoned burrows left by other animals.

== Life expectancy ==
The Pacific gopher snake is observed to live 12 to 15 years in the wild. The oldest known individual lived over 33 years in captivity.

== Reproductive behavior ==
Pacific gopher snakes are an oviparous species whose males begin competing for the opportunity to mate with females from June to August. This competition involves aggressive behaviors such as biting, hissing, and attempting to pin one another to the ground. When a female finally successfully mates, she spends up to six weeks locating and preparing an ideal nesting site. These snakes often choose to nest communally, with multiple females laying their eggs in the same location and in some cases a single nest site can contain as many as 50 eggs, providing a shared space for incubation and eventual hatching which typically takes about 2 to 2.5 months.

In captive breeding, the snake goes through a winter brumation period to improve breeding success. The clutches average 12–14 eggs and hatch in the same time period as in the wild.

== Geographic range ==
The Pacific gopher snake occupies a vast range up and down the West Coast of the United States, ending in the southern coast of California. These snakes can be found in habitats varying from covered woodland to arid deserts but prefer open prairies or grassy meadows. Gopher snakes are rarely seen above 2,000 ft (610 m), except East from the Mississippi at an altitude of up to 2,700 ft (820 m), and are most commonly seen adjacent to farms in semi-arid brushy areas. The Pacific gopher snake can also be found in southern British Columbia and Alberta, and in Mexico.

== Conservation status ==
The Pacific gopher snake is considered to be a species of least concern in terms of conservation. This species is considered a non-threat to society because they are non-venomous and harmless. Gopher snakes create an advantage in maintaining the health of the environment and the population of small mammals like rodents for other predators, and therefore explains why their species remains of least concern. Although their population is generally stable, they still face concerns such as habitat loss, human encroachment, and persecution due to being commonly mistaken as a venomous rattlesnake. Other threats such as human activities that lead to unintentional killings play a role in the impact of the gopher snake's conservation. For example, road traffic is a common threat due to the species being naturally slow and their habit of laying on roads with sun to keep them warm that leads to a variety of roadkill from that population. Consequently, the frequency of road traffic increases the road mortality.
