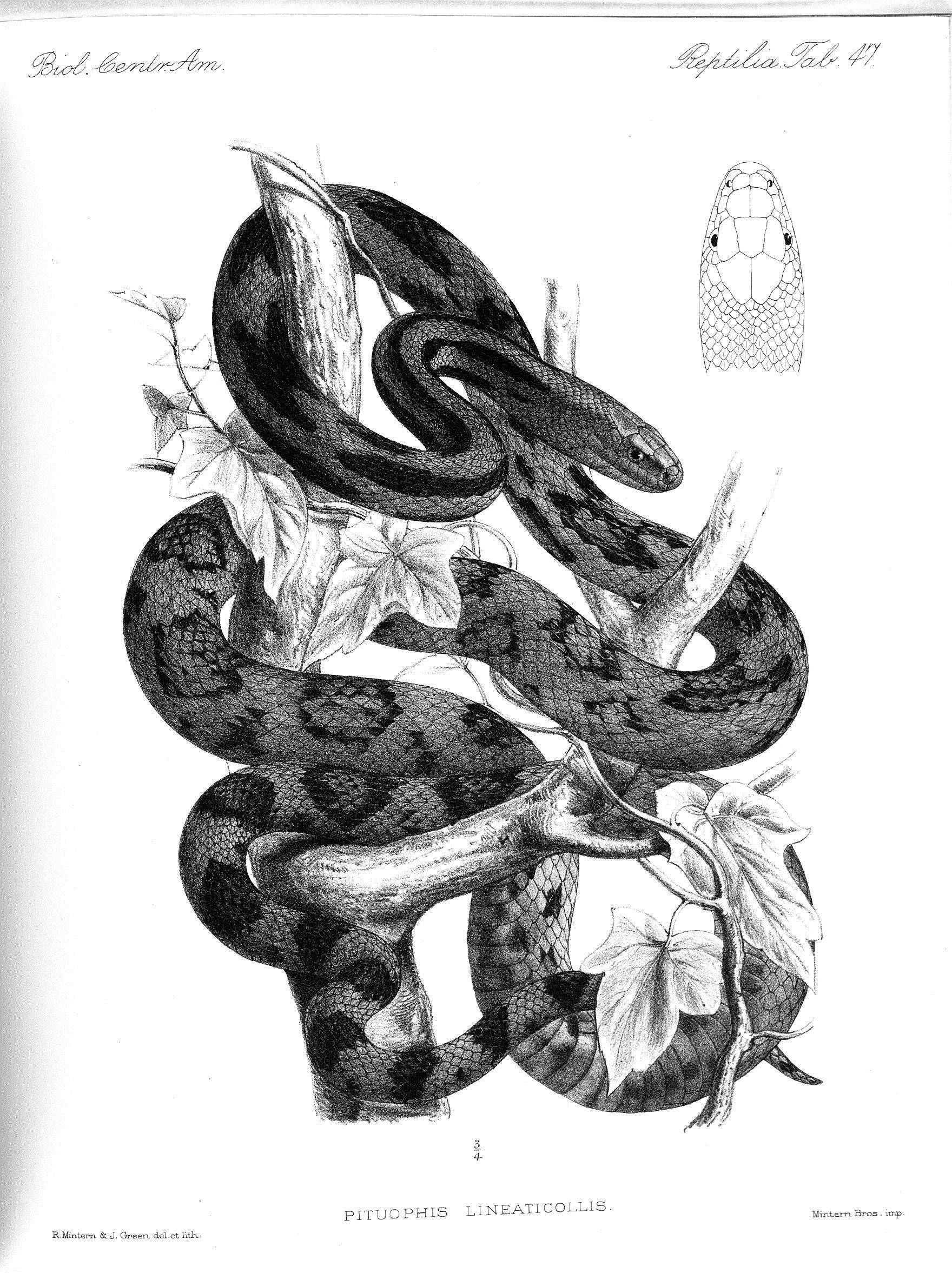
- Illustration from Günther, 1885

Conservation status
- Least Concern (IUCN 3.1)

Scientific classification
- Kingdom: Animalia
- Phylum: Chordata
- Class: Reptilia
- Order: Squamata
- Suborder: Serpentes
- Family: Colubridae
- Genus: Pituophis
- Species: P. lineaticollis

Binomial name
- Pituophis lineaticollis (Cope, 1861)

Synonyms
- Arizona lineaticollis Cope, 1861; Pituophis deppi pholidostictus Jan, 1863; Pituophis lineaticollis — Günther, 1885; Coluber lineaticollis — Boulenger, 1894; Pituophis deppei brevilineata Schmidt & Shannon, 1947; Pituophis deppei gibsoni Stuart, 1954; Pituophis lineaticollis — J. Peters & Orejas-Miranda, 1970

= Pituophis lineaticollis =

Species of snake

Pituophis lineaticollis, commonly known as the Middle American gopher snake or the cincuate bull snake, is a species of nonvenomous snake in the family Colubridae. The species is native to Guatemala and southeastern Mexico. There are two recognized subspecies.

== Geographic range ==
P. lineaticollis is found in Guatemala and in the Mexican states of Chiapas, Guerrero, Jalisco, Mexico, Michoacán, Morelos, Oaxaca, and Querétaro.

== Habitat ==
The preferred natural habitat of P. lineaticollis is forest, at altitudes of 800–2,500 m (2,600–8,200 ft).

== Description ==
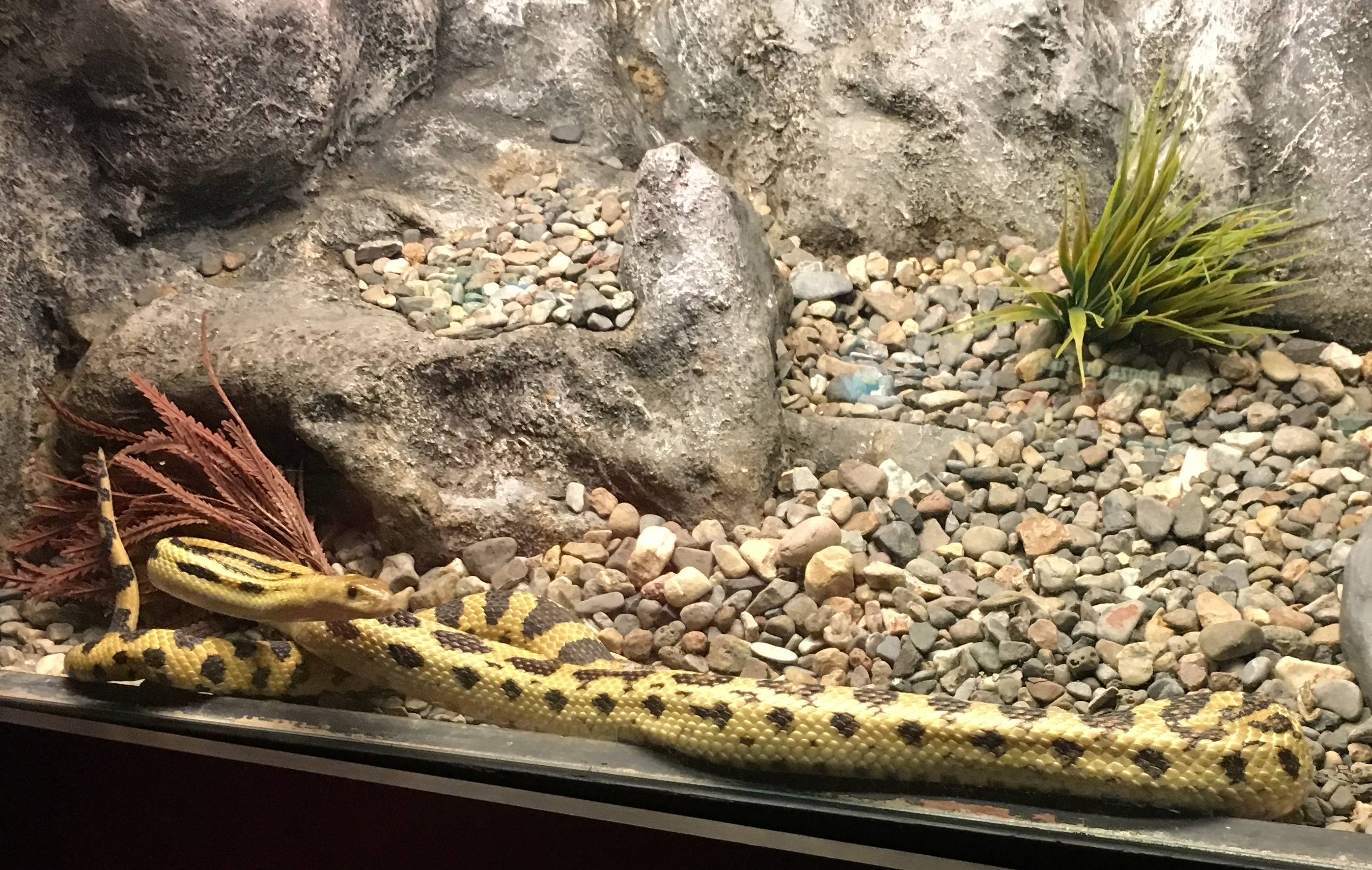
Pituophis lineaticollis in a Mexico City zoo

The longest specimen of P. lineaticollis measured by Boulenger in 1894 had a total length of 1.5 m (4.9 ft), which included a tail 23 cm (9.1 in) long.

== Reproduction ==
P. lineaticollis is oviparous.

== Subspecies ==
Two subspecies are recognized as being valid, including the nominotypical subspecies.

- Pituophis lineaticollis gibsoni Stuart, 1954
- Pituophis lineaticollis lineaticollis (Cope, 1861)

== Etymology ==
The genus name Pituophis is a Latinized modern scientific Greek compound Πιτυόφις : "pine snake"; from Ancient Greek: πίτυς (pítus, "pine"), and Ancient Greek: ὄφις (óphis, "snake").

The subspecific name, gibsoni, is in honor of Colvin A. Gibson (born 1918), a physician who specialized in tropical medicine.
