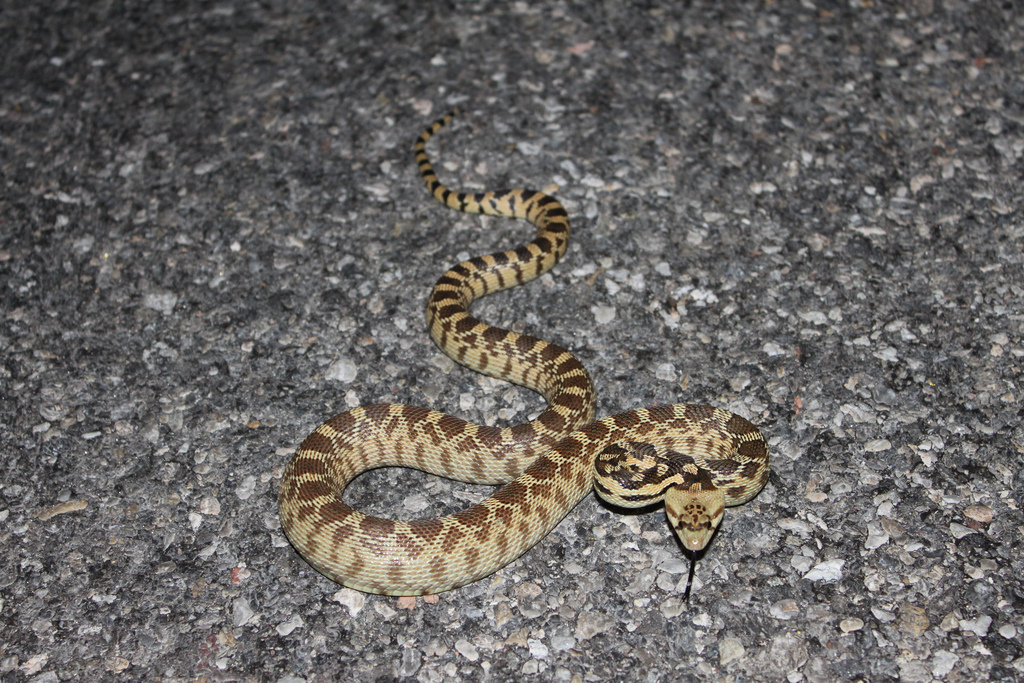

Scientific classification
- Kingdom: Animalia
- Phylum: Chordata
- Class: Reptilia
- Order: Squamata
- Suborder: Serpentes
- Family: Colubridae
- Genus: Pituophis
- Species: P. catenifer
- Subspecies: P. c. deserticola

Trinomial name
- Pituophis catenifer deserticola Stejneger, 1893
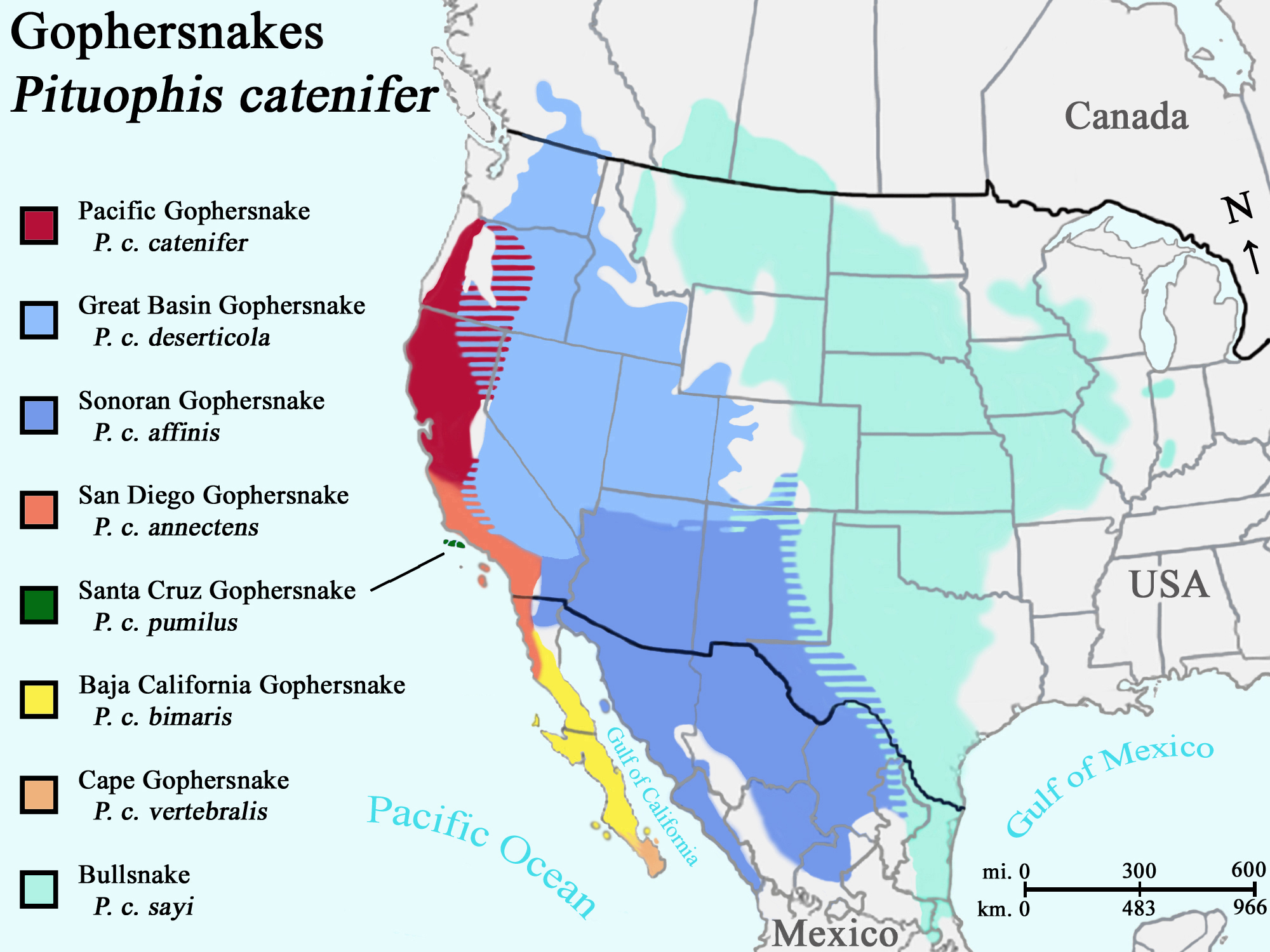

= Pituophis catenifer deserticola =

Subspecies of snake

Pituophis catenifer deserticola, commonly known by its standardized English name since the 1950s, the Great Basin gophersnake, is a subspecies of nonvenomous colubrid snake ranging in parts of western United States and adjacent southwestern Canada.

== Geographic range ==
This snake can be found in the United States throughout most of Nevada and Utah and in adjacent areas of southwest Wyoming, western Colorado, northwest New Mexico, northern Arizona, parts of southeast California, southern Idaho, and northward into eastern Oregon and Washington. It occurs in extreme southcentral British Columbia, Canada as well.

== Description ==
Adults of P. c. deserticola are usually about 4.5 feet (137 cm) in total length. The maximum recorded total length is 5.75 feet (175 cm).

The Great Basin gopher snake has dorsal spots that are dark brown or black, and they are connected to each other by very narrow lines that run along each side of the anterior part of the body. On each side of the neck there usually is a dark longitudinal stripe that is surrounded by some lighter coloring, which eventually breaks up towards the posterior end of the snake and turns into dashes or small spots. The body scales are keeled, and the head has a pointed shape. The underbelly has a creamy color with small, dark, irregular blotches. There is some discrepancy over their average lifespan, the Utah Hogle Zoo reports the average lifespan is 7 years, while others report that the average lifespan for the Great Basin gopher snake as being 12–15 years with the record age being 33 years and 10 months.

Scutellation in Great Basins
Scutellation	Usual # of scales
Midbody	29–35
Ventrals	214–259
Caudals	54–71, divided
Anal	entire
Prefrontal scales	usually 4
Supralabials	8–10
Infralabials	9–15
Preoculars	1–2
Postoculars	2–6

== Habitat ==
The Great Basin gopher snake can be found throughout the western United States in grasslands, woodlands, deserts, coastal sage scrub, agriculture land, and riparian areas.

== Behavior ==
The Great Basin gopher snake is a great climber, swimmer, and burrower. It is one of the most commonly found snakes when people are hiking or driving on the road. They are easily seen in spring when the male snakes are out and about trying to find a mate. The hatchlings are easily found in late August and September when they emerge from their eggs. Like most animals, Great Basin gopher snakes are not dangerous unless provoked. When defending themselves from predators, they will elevate and inflate the body, and flatten the head into a triangular shape. Loud hissing noises will ensue, along with quick shaking of the tail, mimicking the sound of a deadly Great Basin rattlesnake. Unlike a rattlesnake, however, the Great Basin gopher snake is nonvenomous.

== Diet ==
The Great Basin gopher snake is carnivorous, and it preys upon a variety of organisms, including lizards, birds and their eggs, and small mammals (pocket gophers). Mammals are the most common prey item.

== Reproduction ==
Subspecies of gopher snakes lay their eggs from June to August, and the Great Basin gopher snake is no exception. After the sexually mature snakes mate in spring, the females usually lay 3-24 eggs, with 7 eggs being the average. It usually takes the eggs 2 to 2.5 months to hatch. When the young emerge, they are usually in the range of 30–46 cm (12–18 in) in total length.
