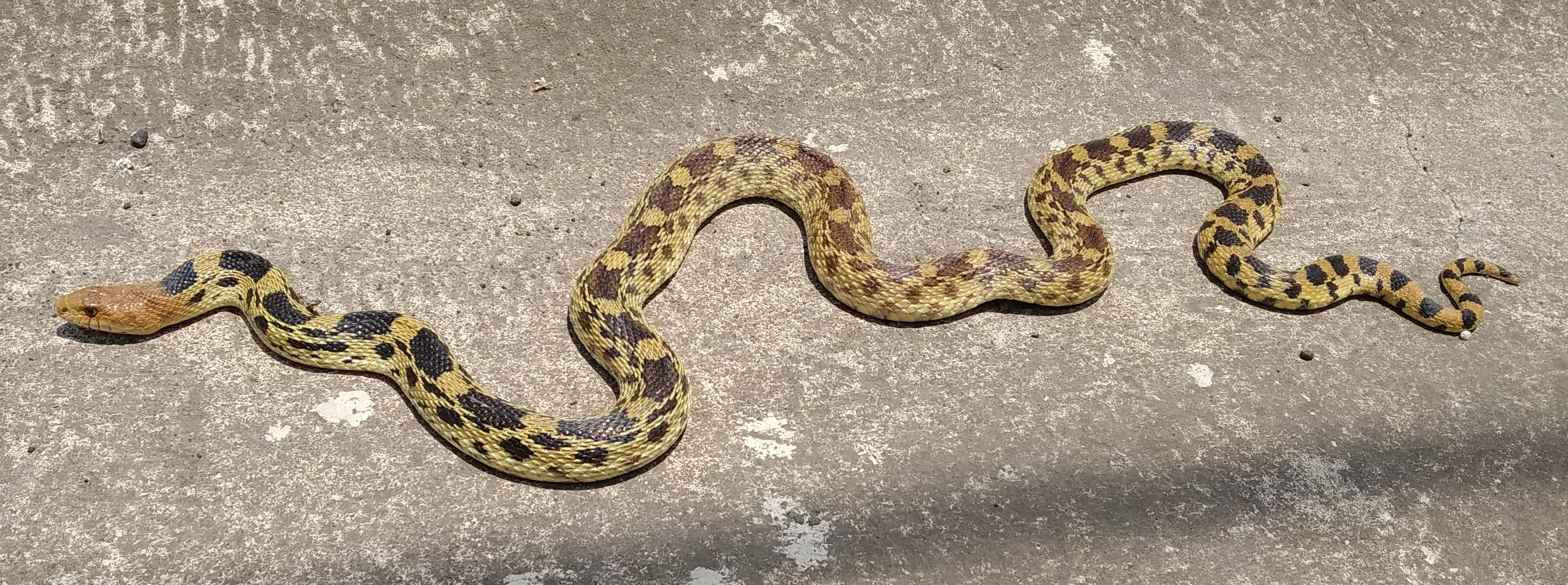

Conservation status
- Least Concern (IUCN 3.1)

Scientific classification
- Kingdom: Animalia
- Phylum: Chordata
- Class: Reptilia
- Order: Squamata
- Suborder: Serpentes
- Family: Colubridae
- Genus: Pituophis
- Species: P. deppei

Binomial name
- Pituophis deppei (A.M.C. Duméril, 1853)

Synonyms
- Elaphis deppei A.M.C. Duméril, 1853; Arizona deppei — Cope, 1861; Arizona jani Cope, 1861; Pituophis deppei — Jan & Sordelli, 1867; Spilotes deppei — Cope, 1887; Coluber deppii — Boulenger, 1896; Pityophis deppei — Dugès, 1898; Pituophis deppei — H.M. Smith, 1944

= Pituophis deppei =

Species of snake

Pituophis deppei, commonly known as the Mexican bullsnake and the Mexican pine snake, is a species of nonvenomous colubrid snake endemic to Mexico. There are two recognized subspecies.

== Etymology ==
The specific name, deppei, is in honor of German artist Ferdinand Deppe, who collected natural history specimens in Mexico.

The subspecific name, jani, is in honor of Italian herpetologist Giorgio Jan.

== Geographic range ==
P. deppei occurs in the Mexican states of Aguascalientes, Coahuila, Guanajuato, Hidalgo, Jalisco, Mexico, Morelos, Nayarit, Nuevo León, Oaxaca, Puebla, Querétaro, San Luis Potosí, Sinaloa, Sonora, and Tamaulipas.

== Habitat ==
The preferred natural habitats of P. deppei are forest, shrubland, and grassland, but it is also found in agricultural, suburban, and urban areas.

== Description ==
Dorsally, P. deppei is yellowish tan, with a series of large quadrangular blotches, which are dark brown to black. It has smaller dark spots on the sides. Ventrally, it is yellowish, with squarish brown spots. Adults may attain a total length of 1.69 m (5.5 ft), including a tail length of 18 cm (7.1 in).

== Reproduction ==
P. deppei is oviparous.

== Subspecies ==
Two subspecies are recognized as being valid, including the nominotypical subspecies.

- Pituophis deppei deppei (A.M.C. Duméril, 1853) – southern Mexican pine snake
- Pituophis deppei jani (Cope, 1861) – northern Mexican pine snake

Nota bene: A trinomial authority in parentheses indicates that the subspecies was originally described in a genus other than Pituophis.
