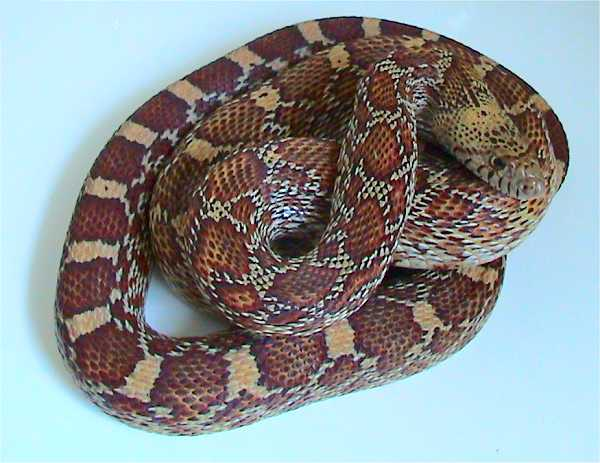

Scientific classification
- Domain: Eukaryota
- Kingdom: Animalia
- Phylum: Chordata
- Class: Reptilia
- Order: Squamata
- Suborder: Serpentes
- Family: Colubridae
- Genus: Pituophis
- Species: P. catenifer
- Subspecies: P. c. affinis

Trinomial name
- Pituophis catenifer affinis (Hallowell, 1852)

Synonyms
- Pityophis affinis Hallowell, 1852; Pituophis sayi affinis — Schmidt & Davis, 1941; Pituophis catenifer affinis — A.H. Wright & A.A. Wright, 1957; Pituophis melanoleucus affinis — Conant, 1975; Pituophis catenifer affinis — Collins, 1997

= Pituophis catenifer affinis =

Subspecies of snake

Pituophis catenifer affinis, commonly known as the Sonoran gopher snake, is a nonvenomous subspecies of colubrid snake that is endemic to the southwestern United States. It is one of six recognized subspecies of the gopher snake, Pituophis catenifer.

== Geographic range ==
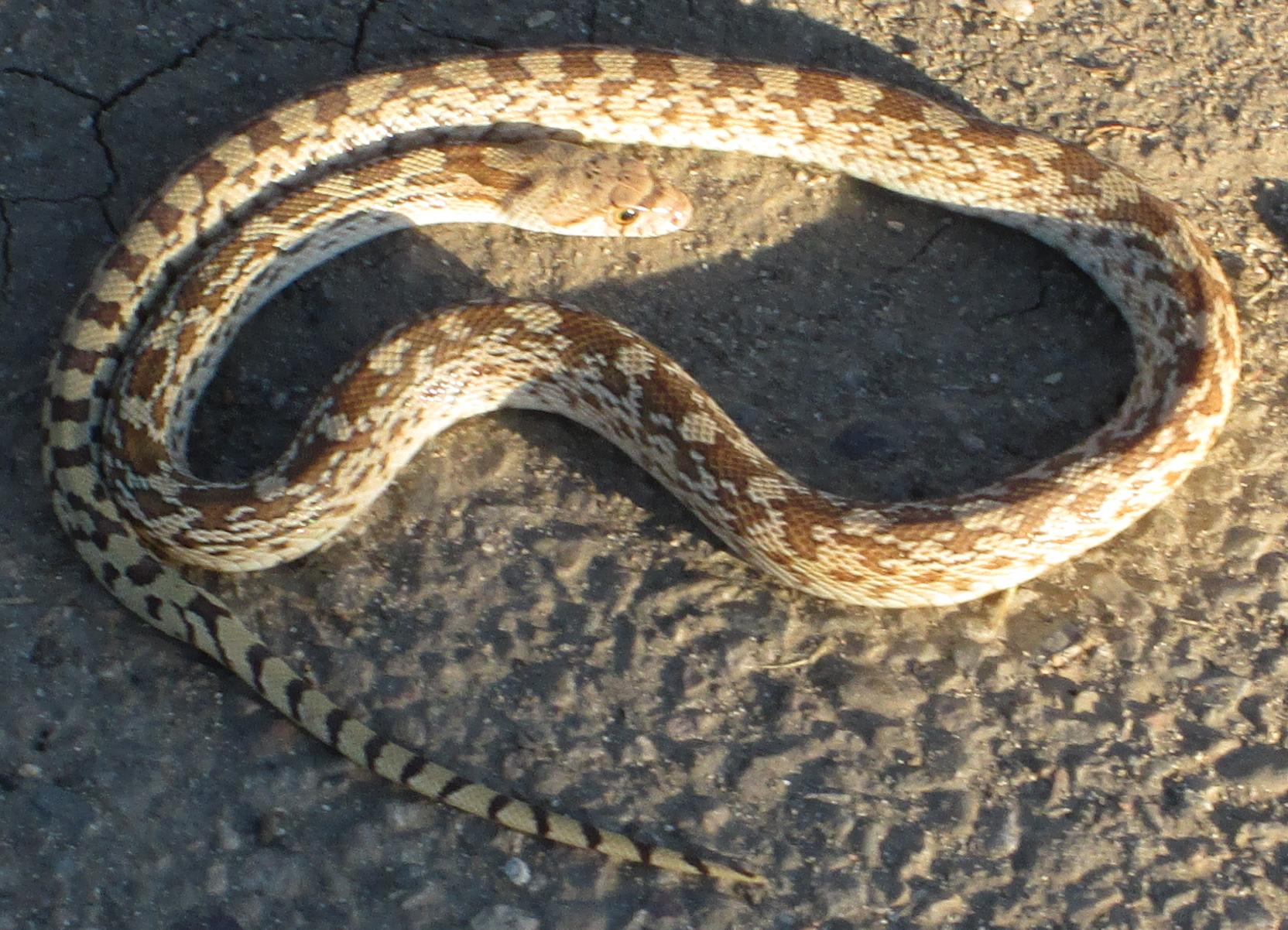
A baby Sonoran gopher snake in Sahuarita, Arizona.

It is found from central Texas across the Southwestern United States to southeastern California, Arizona, and south into the northern states of Mexico.

== Description ==
Adults average 127–183 cm (4.17–6.00 ft) in total length. The maximum recorded total length is 234 cm (7.68 ft).

The saddle-shaped dorsal blotches are reddish brown, except for near and on the tail, where they are dark brown or blackish.

The rostral is about as long as it is broad, not elongated as in other Pituophis subspecies.

== Habitat ==
It primarily inhabits the Sonoran Desert in the Southwest USA, and into northern Mexico.

== Diet ==
They feed on small rodents, hence the common name gopher snake.

== Behavior ==
They are moderately defensive but can be tamed, and become gentle. They have hard, tough skin on their noses used to burrow into gopher holes and the burrows of other rodents in search of prey. During the winter they brumate. When threatened by humans and farm equipment, they tend not to retreat but to hiss and shake their tails, a response that may lead to their being confused with rattlesnakes and killed.

== Reproduction ==
P. c. affinis is oviparous. Adult females lay 7-22 eggs in July or August. The eggs average 51 mm × 35 mm (2.0 in × 1.4 in). The hatchlings are about 40 cm (15.5 in) in total length.
