= Black Racer =

Black Racer may refer to:

- Black Racer (DC Comics), a character from DC Comics
- Black Racer (Marvel Comics), a character from Marvel Comics
- Coluber constrictor, a species of non-venomous, colubrid snakes
  - Coluber constrictor constrictor, the northern black racer
  - Coluber constrictor priapus, the southern black racer
- Neritina pulligera, a freshwater snail
