= Blue Racer =

Blue racer may refer to:

- the cartoon series The Blue Racer
- a subspecies of racer snake, Coluber constrictor foxii
- Marion Blue Racers, the defunct indoor football team
