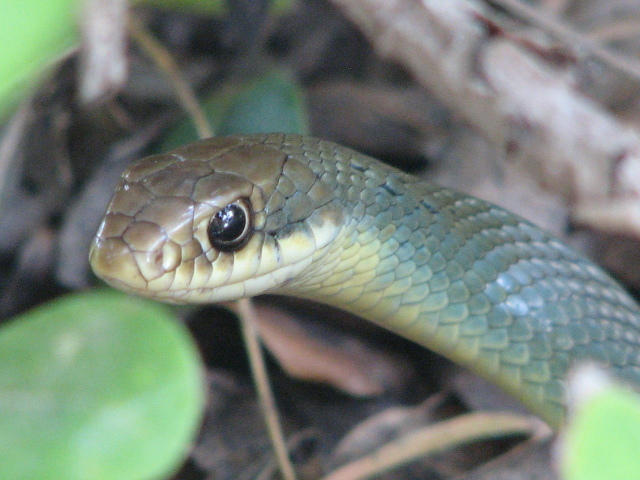

Scientific classification
- Kingdom: Animalia
- Phylum: Chordata
- Class: Reptilia
- Order: Squamata
- Suborder: Serpentes
- Family: Colubridae
- Genus: Coluber
- Species: C. constrictor
- Subspecies: C. c. oaxaca

Trinomial name
- Coluber constrictor oaxaca (Jan, 1863)

Synonyms
- List: Coryphodon oaxaca Jan, 1863; Bascanion oaxaca — Bocourt, 1890; Zamenis oaxacæ — Boulenger, 1893; Zamenis stejnegerianus Cope, 1895; Coluber constrictor stejnegerianus — A.H. Wright & A.A. Wright, 1957; Coluber constrictor oaxaca — Conant, 1975

= Coluber constrictor oaxaca =

Subspecies of snake

Coluber constrictor oaxaca, commonly known as the Mexican racer, is a nonvenomous colubrid snake, a subspecies of the eastern racer (Coluber constrictor).

== Geographic range ==
It is found primarily in Mexico from Tamaulipas to Vera Cruz, with isolated records of it occurring in Nuevo León, Coahuila, Durango, Colima, Oaxaca and Chiapas. The subspecies also ranges as far north as the United States in southern Texas and as far south as Guatemala. It is known to intergrade with the eastern yellow-bellied racer (Coluber constrictor flaviventris).

== Description ==
Adults of Coluber constrictor oaxaca are 51–102 cm (20-40 inches) in total length.

They are greenish dorsally and yellowish ventrally. They have eight upper labials and eight lower labials.

Juveniles have dark, narrow, close-spaced crossbands on the anterior part of the body, unlike the mid-dorsal blotches of juveniles of most other subspecies of Coluber constrictor.
