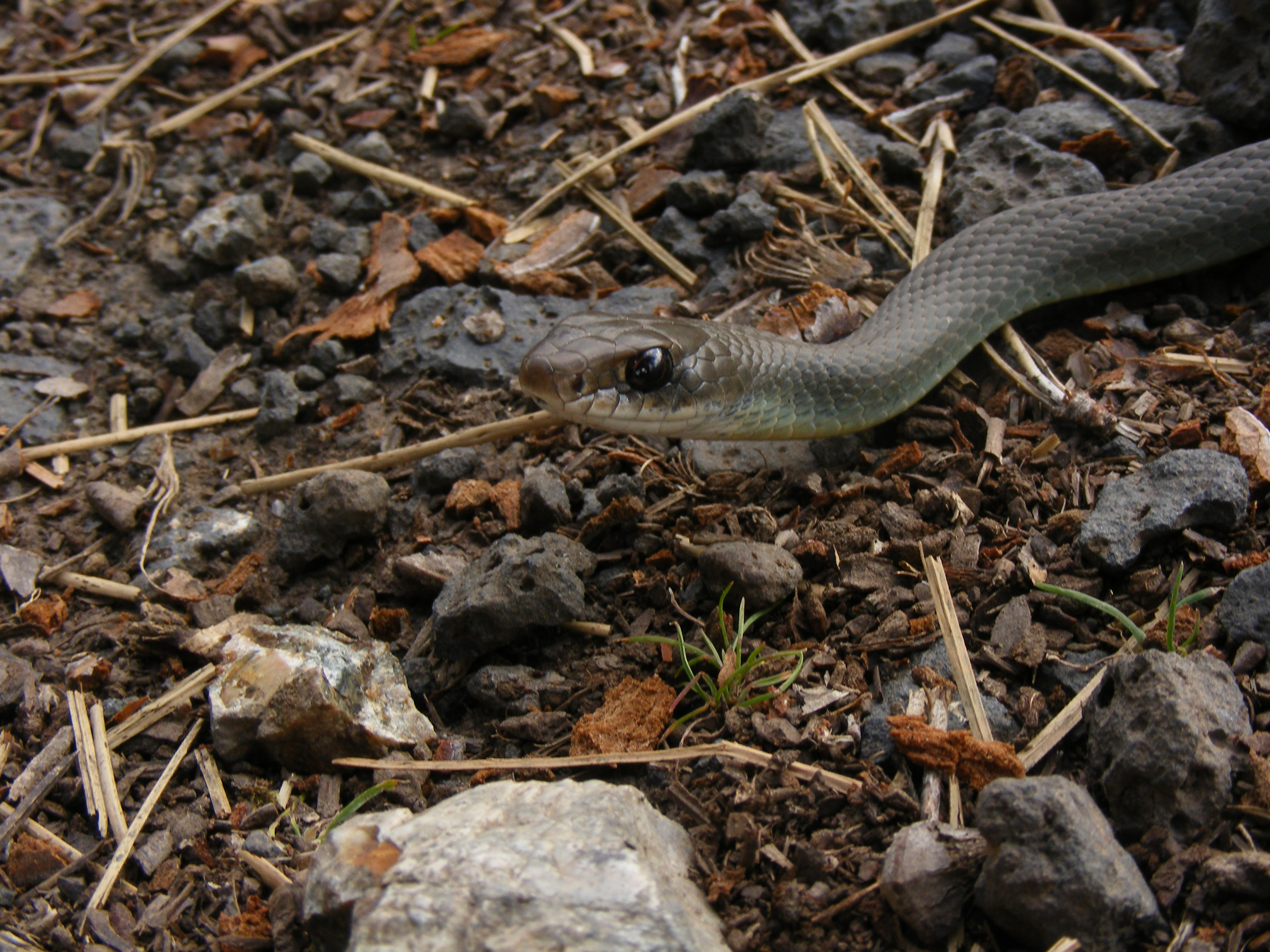
- Closeup of the head of a western yellow-bellied racer in Washington state.

Scientific classification
- Kingdom: Animalia
- Phylum: Chordata
- Class: Reptilia
- Order: Squamata
- Suborder: Serpentes
- Family: Colubridae
- Genus: Coluber
- Species: C. constrictor
- Subspecies: C. c. mormon

Trinomial name
- Coluber constrictor mormon (Baird & Girard, 1852)

= Western yellow-bellied racer =

Subspecies of snake

The western yellow-bellied racer (Coluber constrictor mormon), also known as the western yellowbelly racer or western racer, is a snake subspecies endemic to the Western United States, including California, Oregon, Washington, Idaho, Nevada, New Mexico, Utah, Montana and Colorado. It is a subspecies of the eastern racer. It is nonvenomous and is recognized by its long and very slender shape. It is visually similar to the eastern yellow-bellied racer, which is also green, blue or brown with a recognizable yellow underside. Also named for its color, the western yellow-bellied racer is also gray with red or brown blotches when young.
