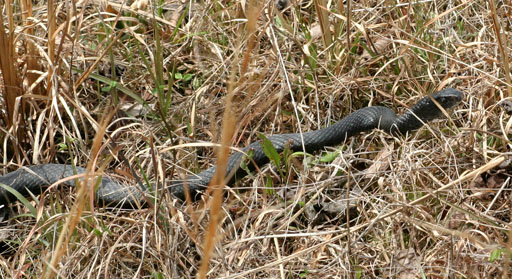

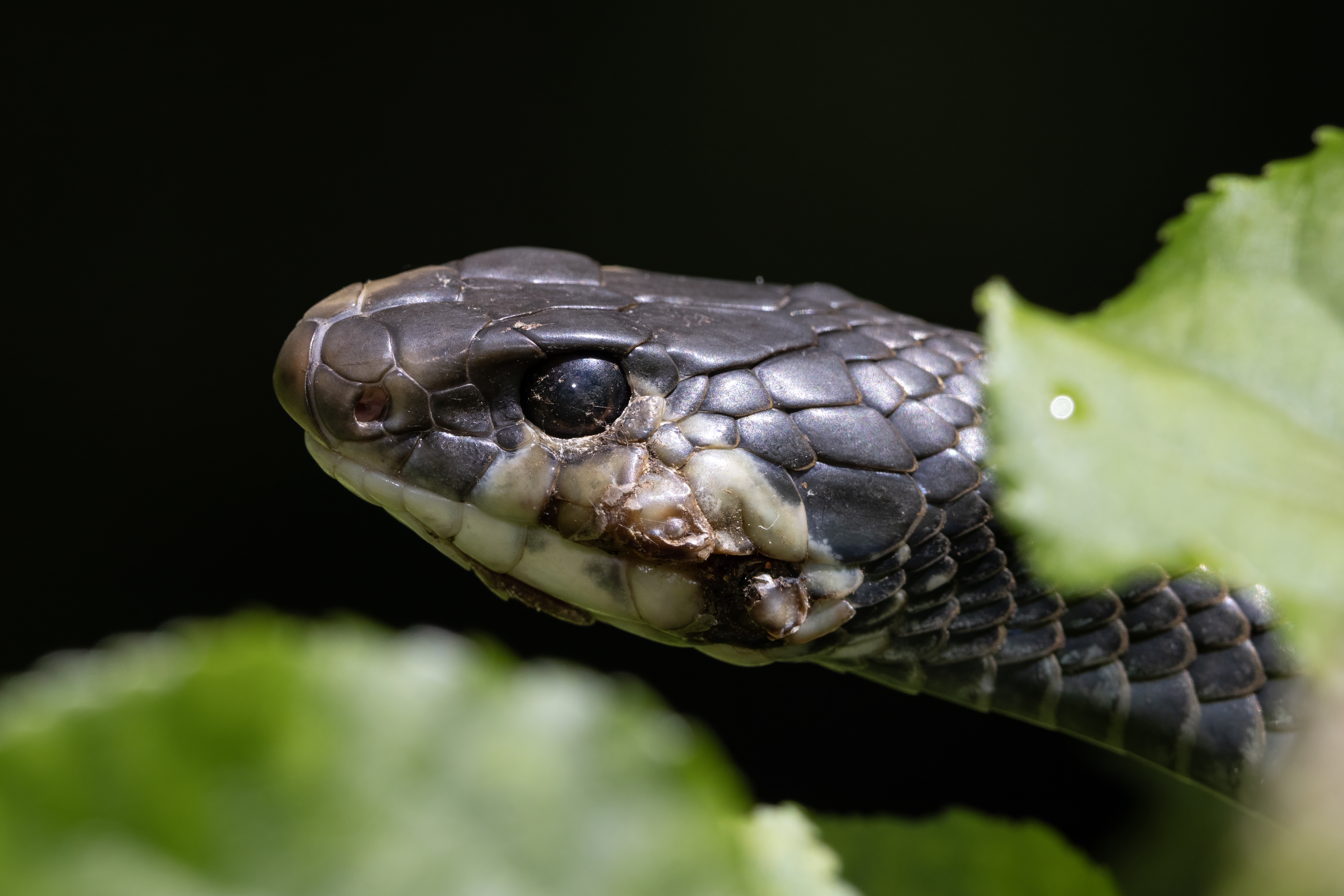

Conservation status
- Secure (NatureServe)

Scientific classification
- Kingdom: Animalia
- Phylum: Chordata
- Class: Reptilia
- Order: Squamata
- Suborder: Serpentes
- Family: Colubridae
- Genus: Coluber
- Species: C. constrictor
- Subspecies: C. c. constrictor

Trinomial name
- Coluber constrictor constrictor Linnaeus, 1758

Synonyms
- Coluber constrictor Linnaeus, 1758; Bascanion constrictor — Baird & Girard, 1853; Coryphodon constrictor — A.M.C. Duméril & Bibron, 1854; Zamenis constrictor — Boulenger, 1893; Coluber constrictor — Stejneger & Barbour, 1917

= Northern black racer =

Subspecies of snake

The northern black racer (Coluber constrictor constrictor) is a subspecies of the eastern racer (Coluber constrictor), a nonvenomous snake in the family Colubridae. Their geographic range extends from southern Maine to northern Georgia and westward to central Kentucky and eastern Ohio. Their occupancy is dependent on the availability of large patches of open habitats.

== Geographic range ==
Coluber constrictor constrictor ranges from Georgia, Alabama, and Mississippi in the south, to central New York, Vermont, New Hampshire, and Maine in the north, to Tennessee, Kentucky, and eastern Ohio in the west. At the southern end of its range, it overlaps with Coluber constrictor priapus, the southern black racer, and at the westward end it overlaps with Coluber constrictor flaviventris, the eastern yellow-bellied racer.

== Description ==
The northern black racer is a long, shiny black snake known to reach 1.8 m (6 ft). They have a plain white chin with most black/brown heads, with the center of the tail being plain white. Upon hatching, the juveniles tend to have dark gray to reddish-brown dorsal patterns with a light gray to brown body that becomes occluded with age and the melanin becoming so abundant that all but the pale chin and brown snout are obscured. Northern black racer snakes are seen as 'high-strung' and defensive when cornered, but injuries are very rare, outside of one incident where a victim got bit in the eye.

== Habitat ==
Northern black racer are a terrestrial species and are found in open, grassy areas or in open forest adjacent to grassy areas. They prefer drier habitats. They will inhabit urban and agricultural areas, barrier islands, and grasslands in mountains. The Northern black racer will seek refuge under objects like logs, rocks, and other debris during the night or on cool days.

== Reproduction ==
Upon reaching sexual maturity, C. c. constrictor begins migrating to grasslands that support adult mating opportunities that occurs from April to October, with an unimodal or one peak during the late spring to early summer periods. A study found that juvenile young obtain calcium from the eggshell during incubation. This indicates that eggshell composition plays an active role in supporting skeletal development before hatching.

== Symbol ==
The northern black racer is the state reptile of Ohio.

== Gallery ==
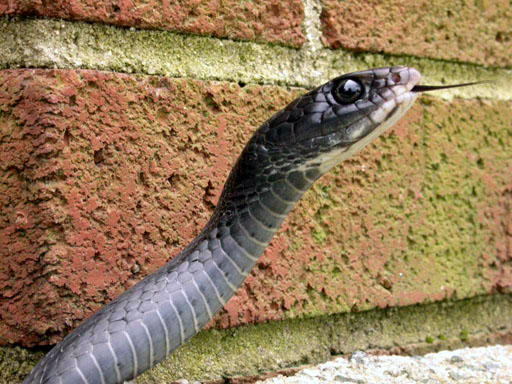
Adult northern black racer, C. c. constrictor

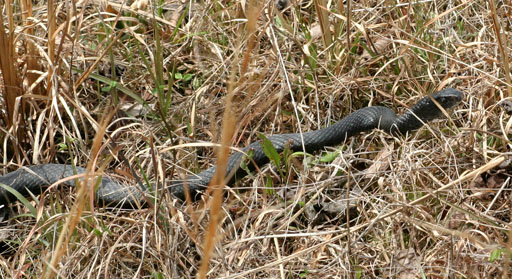
Adult northern black racer, C. c. constrictor, in typical habitat

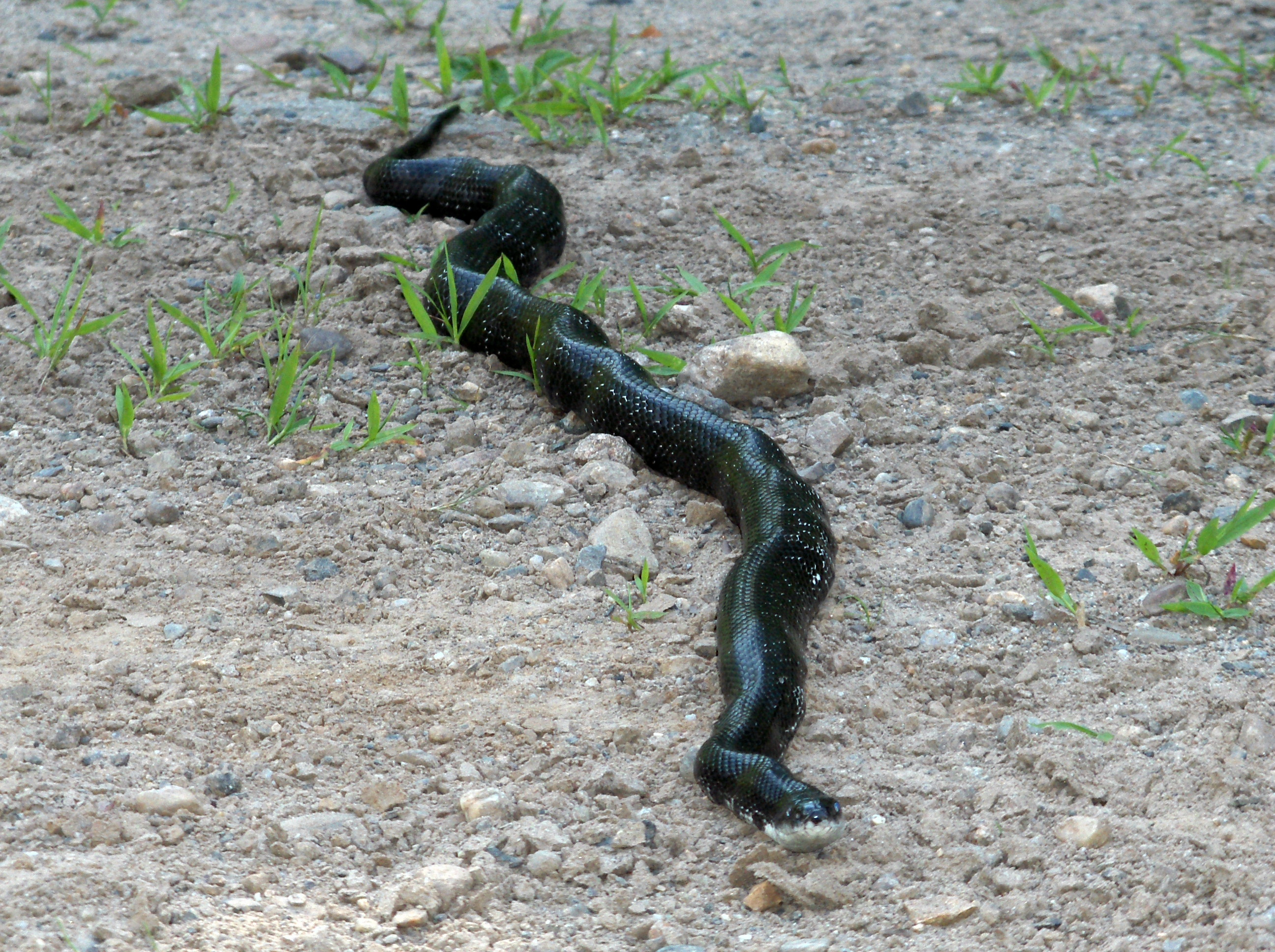
Adult black rat snake, Pantherophis obsoletus, often confused with the northern black racer
