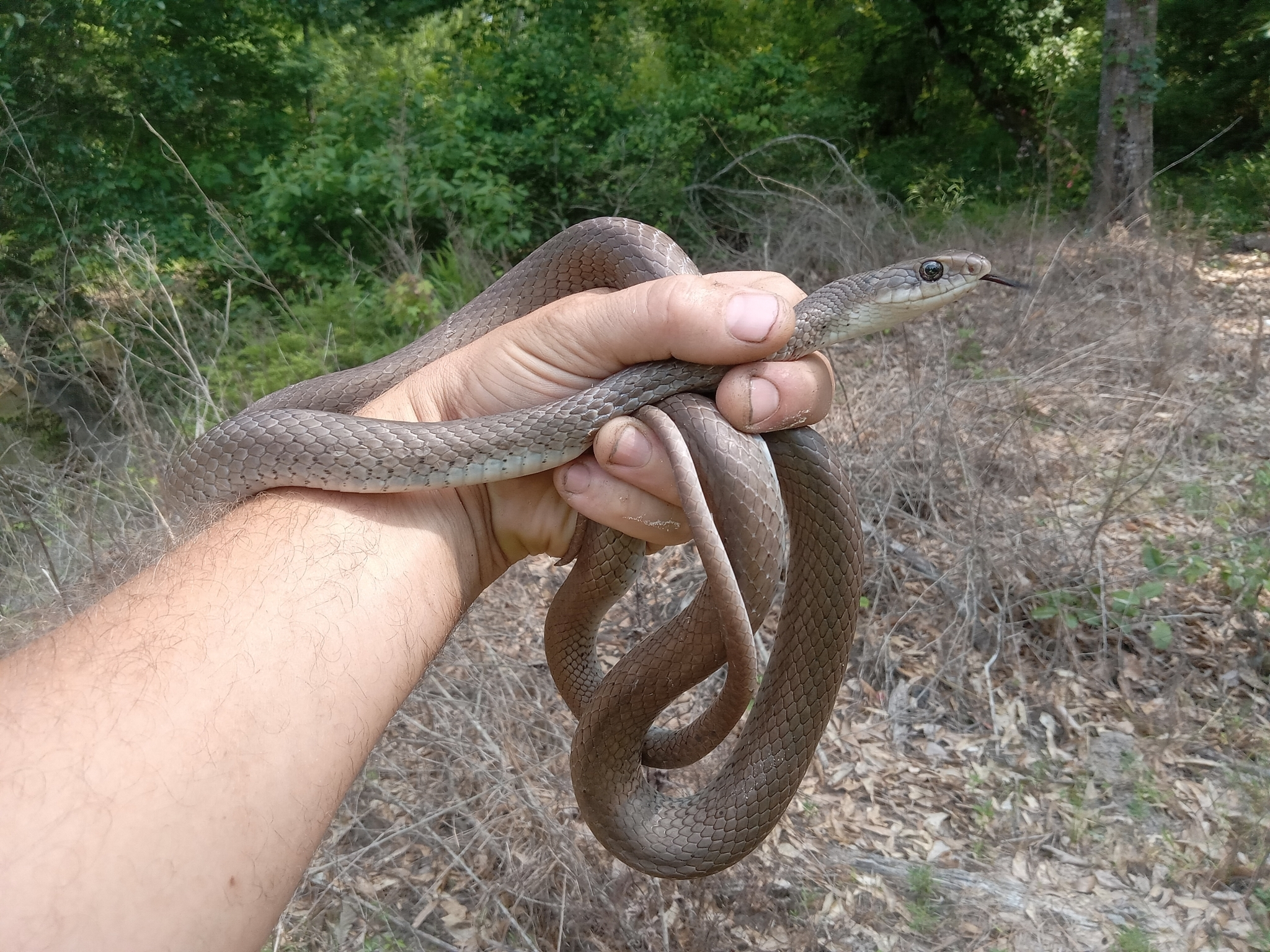

Scientific classification
- Kingdom: Animalia
- Phylum: Chordata
- Class: Reptilia
- Order: Squamata
- Suborder: Serpentes
- Family: Colubridae
- Genus: Coluber
- Species: C. constrictor
- Subspecies: C. c. etheridgei

Trinomial name
- Coluber constrictor etheridgei Wilson, 1970

= Coluber constrictor etheridgei =

Subspecies of snake

Coluber constrictor etheridgei, commonly known as the tan racer, is a subspecies of nonvenomous snake in the family Colubridae, a subspecies of the eastern racer (Coluber constrictor). The subspecies is native to the southern United States.

== Geographic range ==
C. c. etheridgei is found in west-central Louisiana and adjacent eastern Texas.

== Etymology ==
The subspecific name or epithet, etheridgei, is in honor of the American herpetologist Richard Emmett Etheridge.

== Description ==
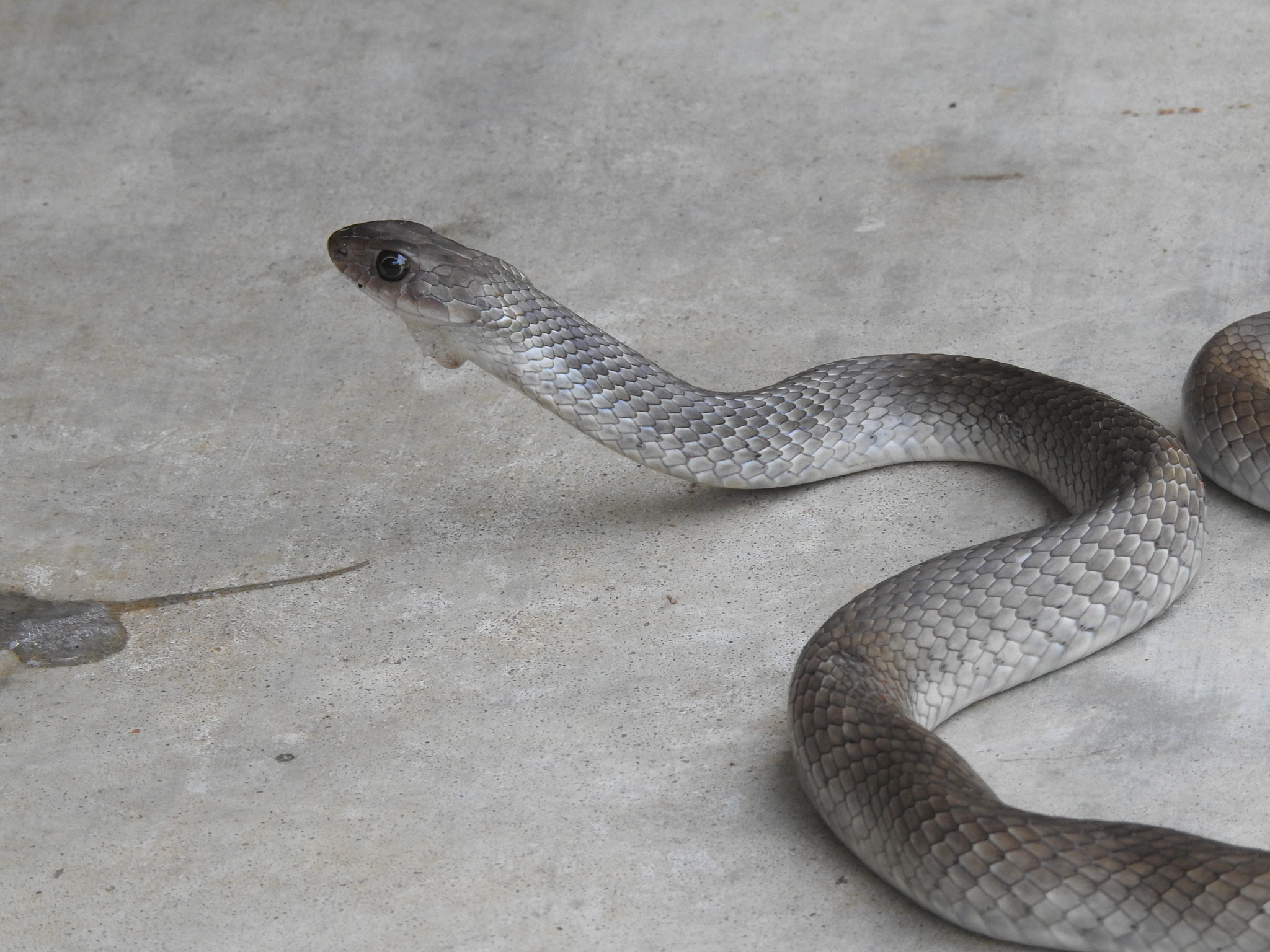
In Texas

The tan racer, as its name implies, is typically a solid tan in color. Juveniles have a pattern of dark brown dorsal blotches, which fade to solid tan at about a year of age. The underside is typically gray or white, sometimes with yellow spotting. It typically grows from .75 – 1.5 m (30 to 60 inches) in total length (including tail). It has large eyes, with round pupils, and excellent vision.

== Behavior ==
Like all racers, the tan racer is diurnal and highly active. Its diet consists of a wide variety of prey, but primarily includes rodents, and lizards. It is fast moving, and generally seeks to use its speed to escape if approached.

== Habitat ==
The tan racer prefers habitats of pine flatwoods.

== Reproduction ==
C. c. etheridgei is oviparous. Mating occurs in the spring, and a clutch of approximately 30 eggs is laid typically in the month of May, to hatch mid summer.
