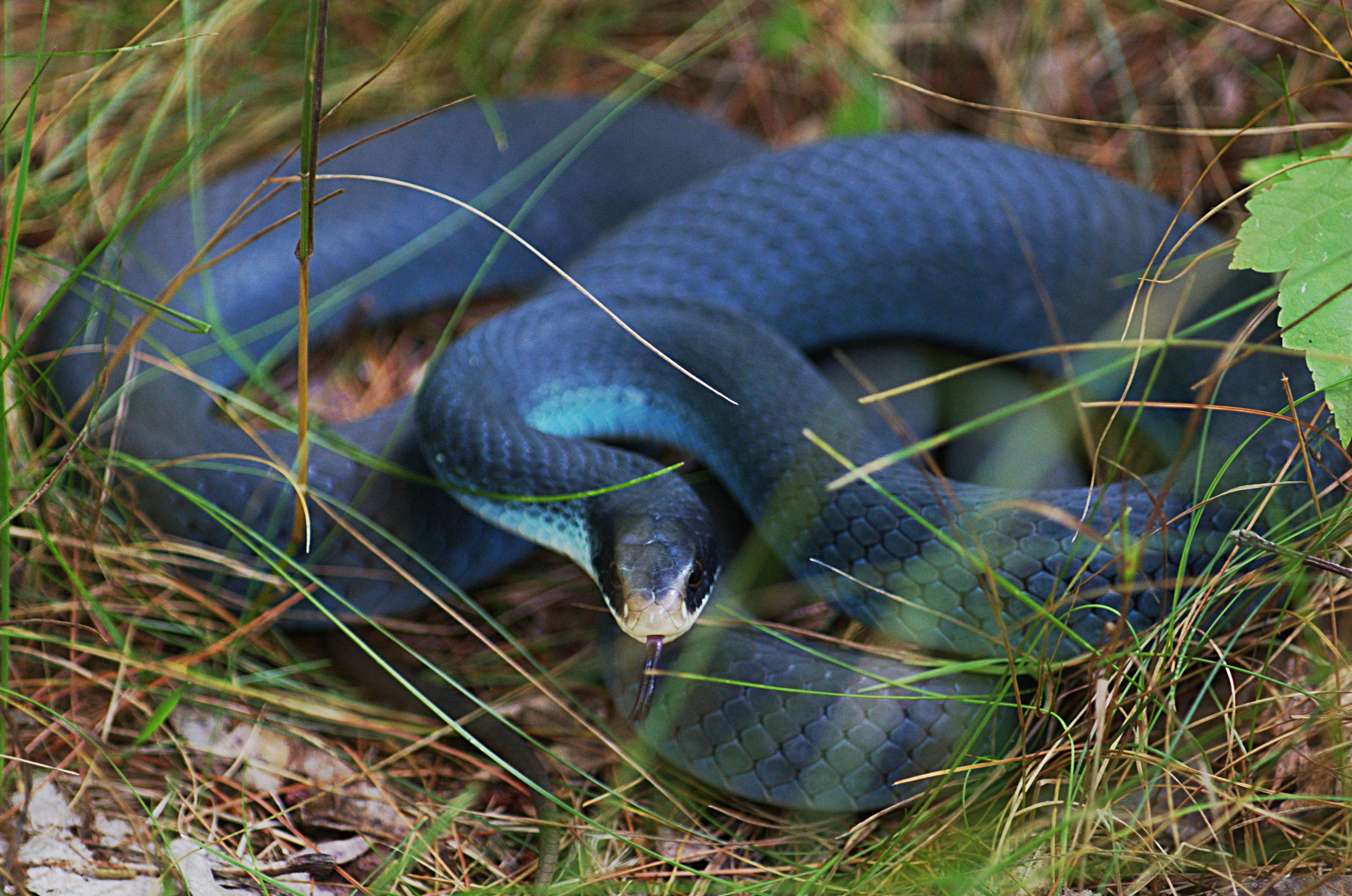

Conservation status
- Secure (NatureServe)

Scientific classification
- Kingdom: Animalia
- Phylum: Chordata
- Class: Reptilia
- Order: Squamata
- Suborder: Serpentes
- Family: Colubridae
- Genus: Coluber
- Species: C. constrictor
- Subspecies: C. c. foxii

Trinomial name
- Coluber constrictor foxii (Baird & Girard, 1853)

Synonyms
- Bascanion foxii Baird & Girard, 1853; Coryphodon constrictor – Duméril & Bibron, 1854; Zamenis constrictor – Boulenger, 1893

= Coluber constrictor foxii =

Subspecies of snake

Coluber constrictor foxii, commonly known as the blue racer, is a subspecies of Coluber constrictor, a species of nonvenomous colubrid snake commonly referred to as the eastern racer.

== Distribution ==
Blue racers prefer open and semi-open habitats, savanna, old field shoreline, and edge habitats. A mosaic of these habitats is likely required to fulfill the ecological needs of C. c. foxii.

In the United States: Ohio, Indiana, Illinois, Michigan, Wisconsin, South Dakota, and Iowa are the only states with extant populations of blue racer. The last reliable record of the blue racer on mainland Canada was in Ontario in 1983. On Pelee Island in Ontario, the blue racer is restricted to the eastern two-thirds of the island.

== Description ==
Blue racers often have creamy white ventral scales, dull grey to brilliant blue lateral scales, and pale brown to dark grey dorsum. They also have characteristic black masks, relatively large eyes, and often have brownish-orange rostral scales (snouts). Unlike adults, hatchlings and yearlings (first full active season) have dorsal blotches that fade completely by the third year; however, juvenile patterning is still visible on the venter until late in the snake's third season.

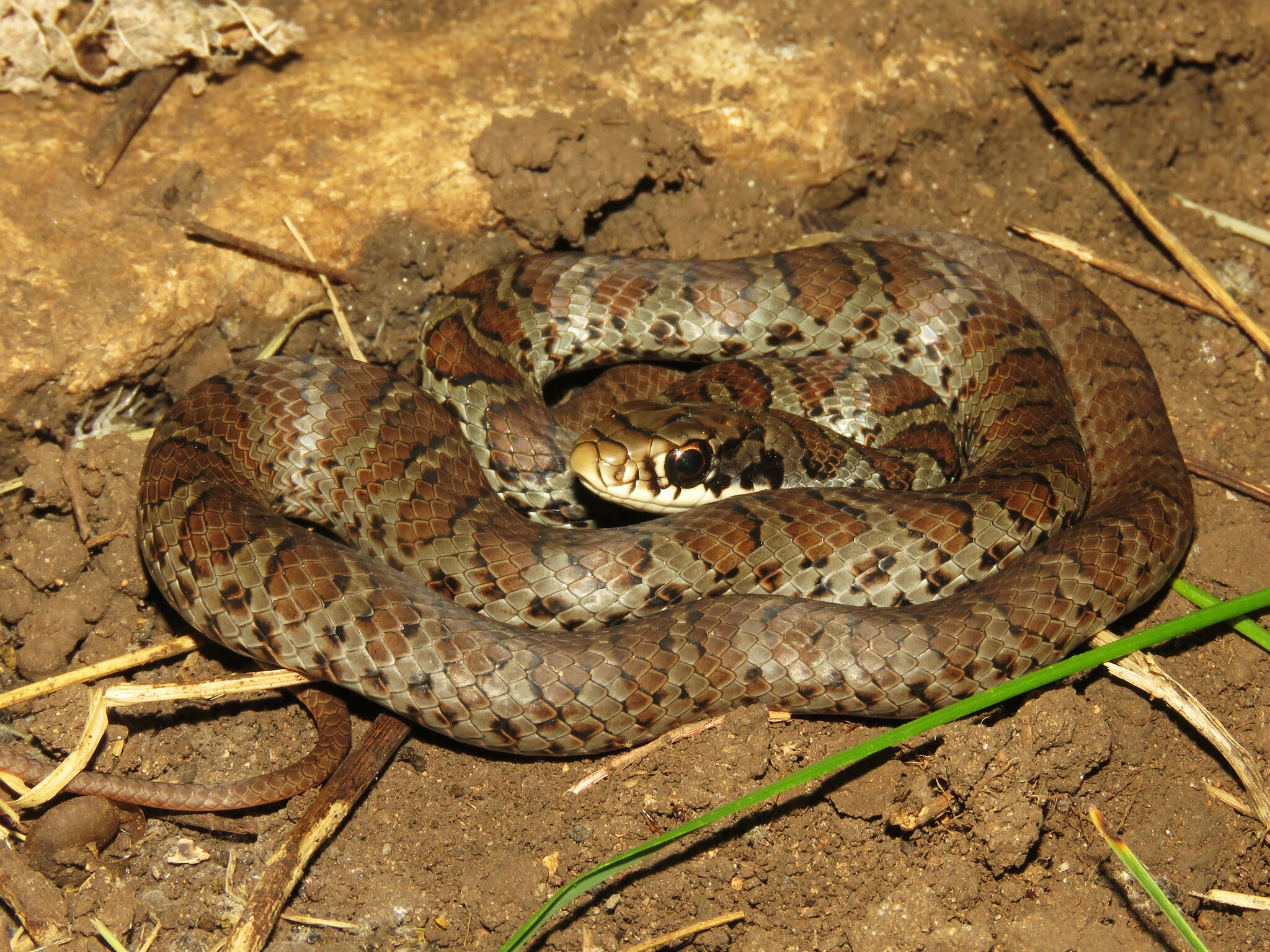
Juvenile

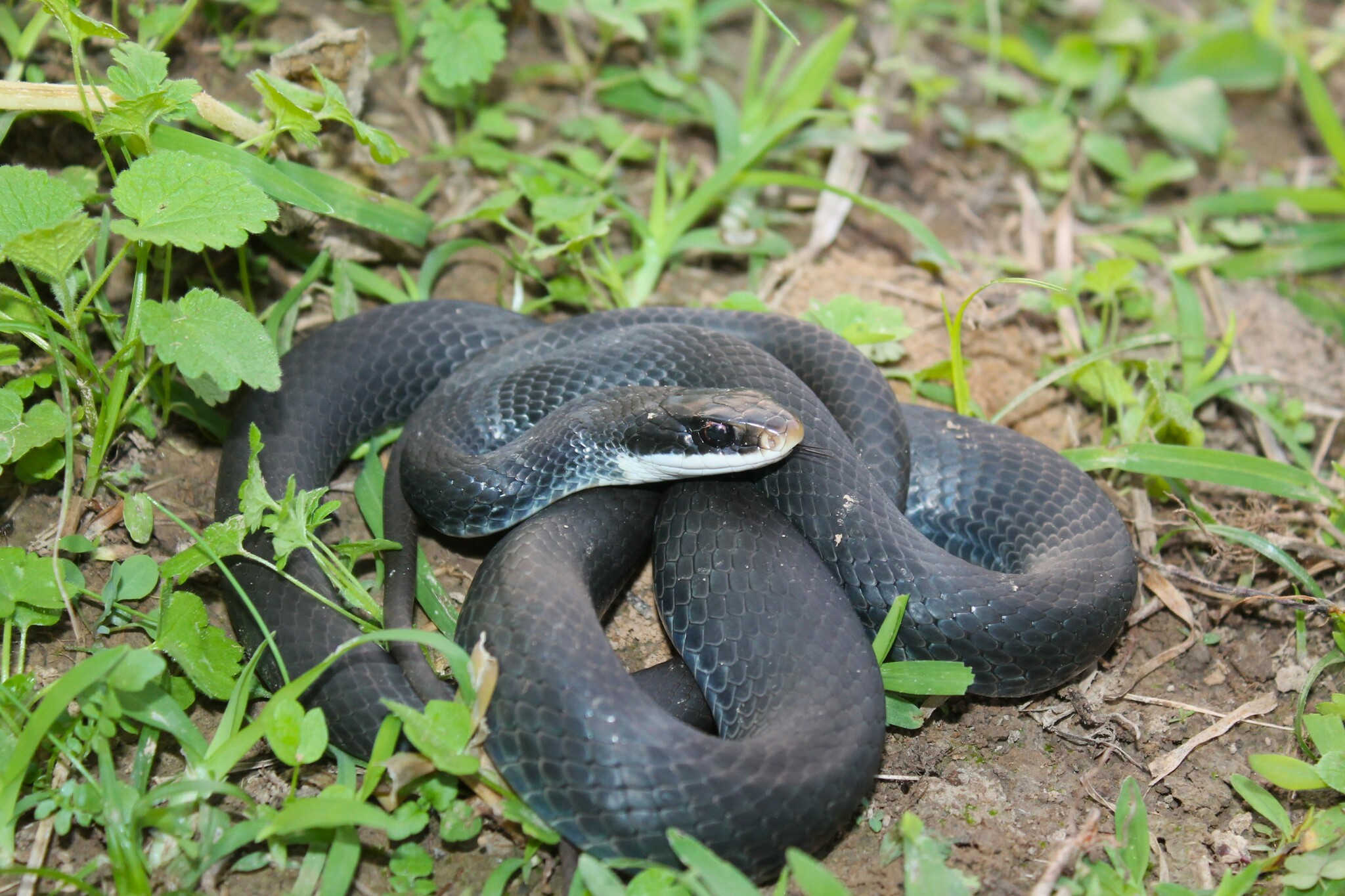
Adult

The blue racer is one of Ontario's largest snakes, reaching 90 cm to 152 cm snout-to-vent length (SVL). The largest documented specimen captured on Pelee Island was 138 cm SVL. Although there has been some controversy regarding the designation of C.c. foxii as a subspecies distinct from C.c. flaviventris (the eastern yellow-bellied racer), most recent authorities agree that the subspecies C.c. foxii is valid.

== Biology ==
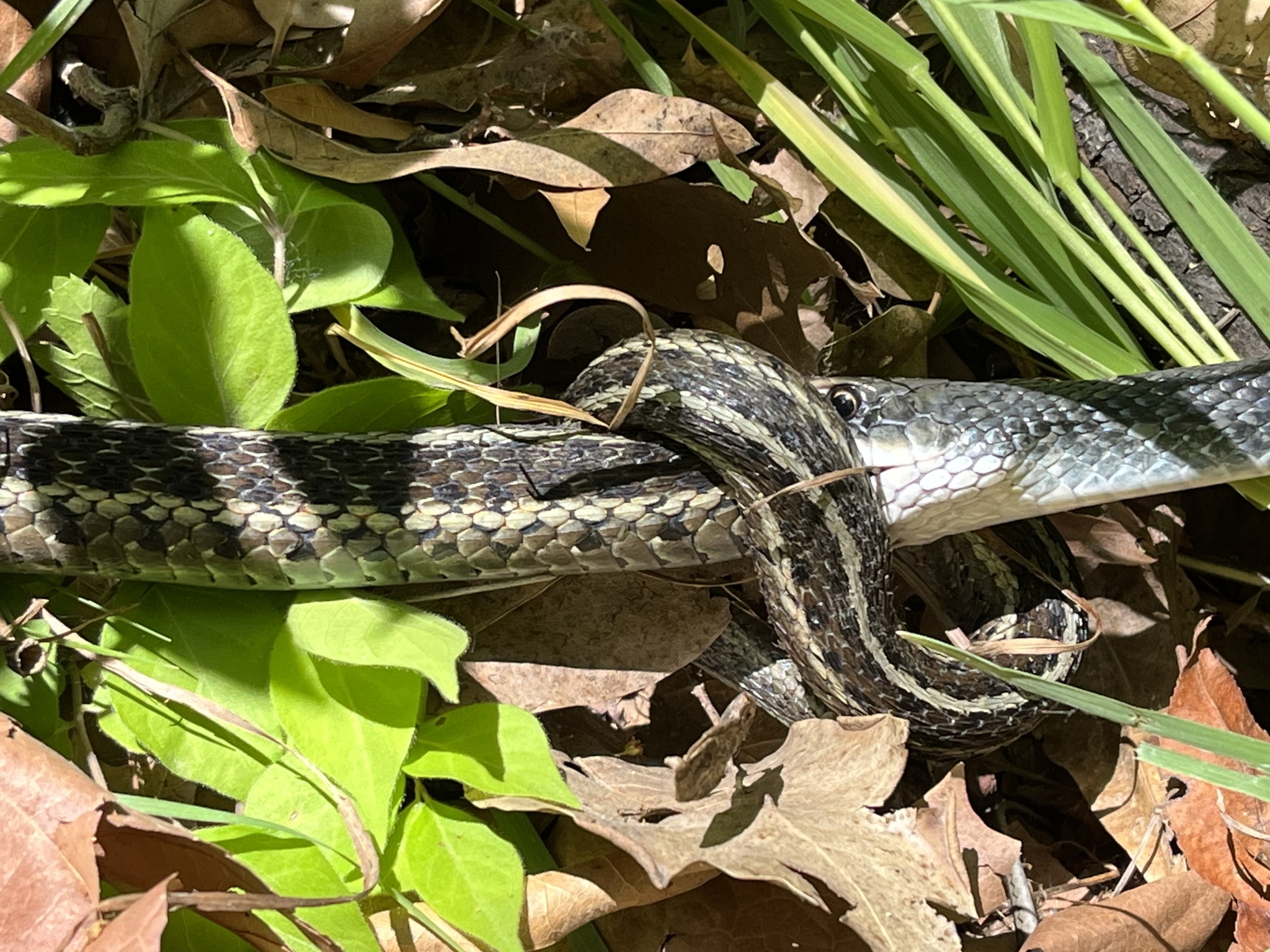
Attempting (unsuccessfully) to eat a common garter snake.

Blue racers are active foragers. The younger snakes may eat crickets and other insects, whereas adults feed primarily on rodents, songbirds and other snakes. Adults engage in both terrestrial and arboreal foraging. Blue racers are diurnally active. Probable natural predators of adult blue racers include the larger birds of prey (e.g., red-tailed hawk, northern harrier, great horned owl) and carnivorous mammals such as raccoons, foxes and coyotes. Dogs and feral house cats are known to kill and/or harass juvenile blue racers. The eggs and young are likely vulnerable to a wider variety of avian and mammalian predators.

Blue racers seem to be relatively intolerant of high levels of human activity and for most of the active season, they remain in areas of low human density. Evidence to suggest this comes largely from radio telemetry data from both blue racers and eastern fox snakes that inhabited the same general areas on Pelee Island (although studies were not conducted concurrently). In contrast to blue racers, eastern fox snakes were often found under front porches, in barns/garages, and in the foundations of houses; whereas, most (but not all) blue racers were observed in more "natural" settings. Therefore, blue racers are more confined to areas with minimal anthropogenic activity. Campbell and Perrin also noted that racers were among the first snakes to disappear from suburban areas.

== Reproduction ==
The blue racer is oviparous and the average clutch size for seven females is 14.7 ± 2.53. Females can reproduce annually, but biennial cycles are likely more common. Males can mature physiologically at 11 months, but do not have the opportunity to mate until their second full year; similarly, females may mature at 24 months but are not able to reproduce until the following year. Mating begins in April and continues throughout May. Females oviposit in late June and eggs hatch from mid-August to late-September. The most common nesting microhabitats used by female blue racers are fallen decaying logs; however, eggs are also laid under large rocks and in mounds of decaying organic matter. Intra- and interspecific (with the eastern fox snake) communal nest sites have been documented and appear to be relatively common.

== Conservation ==
The snake has not yet been assessed for the IUCN Red List in terms of conservation, but is listed as endangered in Canada by the Committee on the Status of Endangered Wildlife in Canada. It is listed as a species of special concern in the state of Wisconsin and is listed as a threatened species in Ohio.

The blue racer has been on Ontario's Endangered Species List since 1971. Consequently, habitat determined to be critical to the snake's persistence is protected (from destruction or significant alteration) under Ontario's Endangered Species Act (ESA). In 1998, blue racer "habitat" on Pelee Island was spatially delineated (primarily utilizing mark-recapture and radio telemetry data collected from 1990 to 1998) and formally identified for the Conservation Land Tax Incentive Program, Ontario Ministry of Natural Resources (OMNR). Subsequent to the spatial delineation (or mapping) of this habitat, the OMNR determined that these lands should be protected from destruction or human interference as is required under the ESA. The habitat protection afforded by the ESA has significant land-use implications, particularly because a substantial percentage of blue racer habitat identified occurs on private lands. Unfortunately, implementing a program to effectively protect endangered species habitat on private lands has been extremely difficult. Several areas are known to harbor blue racers and the important microhabitats used by them (e.g., hibernacula) are formally protected on Pelee Island. Lighthouse Point Provincial Nature Reserve and the Stone Road Alvar Complex (owned and managed by the Federation of Ontario Naturalists, Essex Region Conservation Authority, and Nature Conservancy Canada) are the two most important protected areas for the blue racer.

== In popular culture ==
The Philadelphia Union mascot, Phang, is an eastern blue racer.
