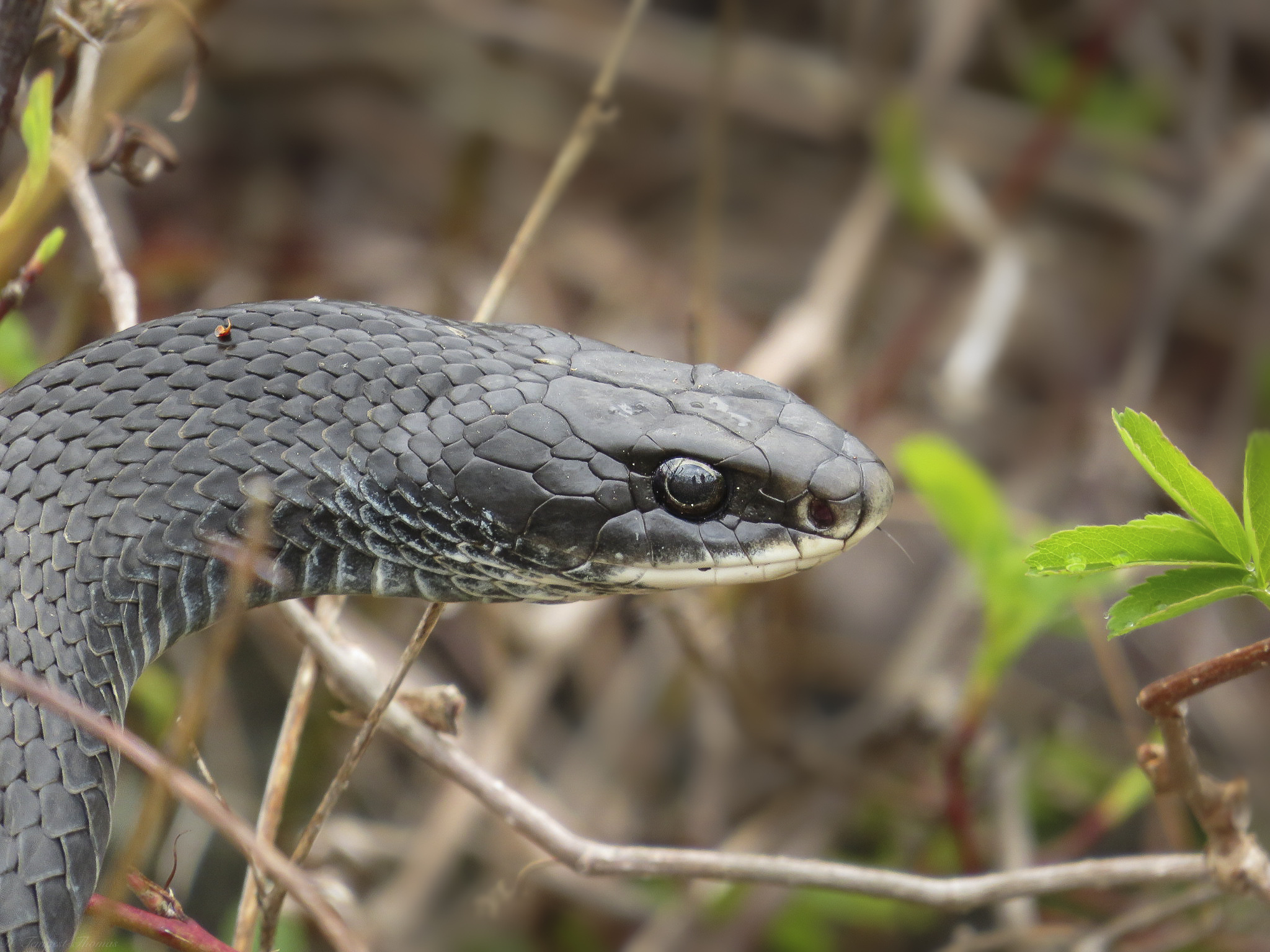
- Northern black racer (Coluber constrictor constrictor)

Conservation status
- Least Concern (IUCN 3.1)

Scientific classification
- Kingdom: Animalia
- Phylum: Chordata
- Class: Reptilia
- Order: Squamata
- Suborder: Serpentes
- Family: Colubridae
- Genus: Coluber; Linnaeus, 1758
- Species: C. constrictor

Binomial name
- Coluber constrictor Linnaeus, 1758
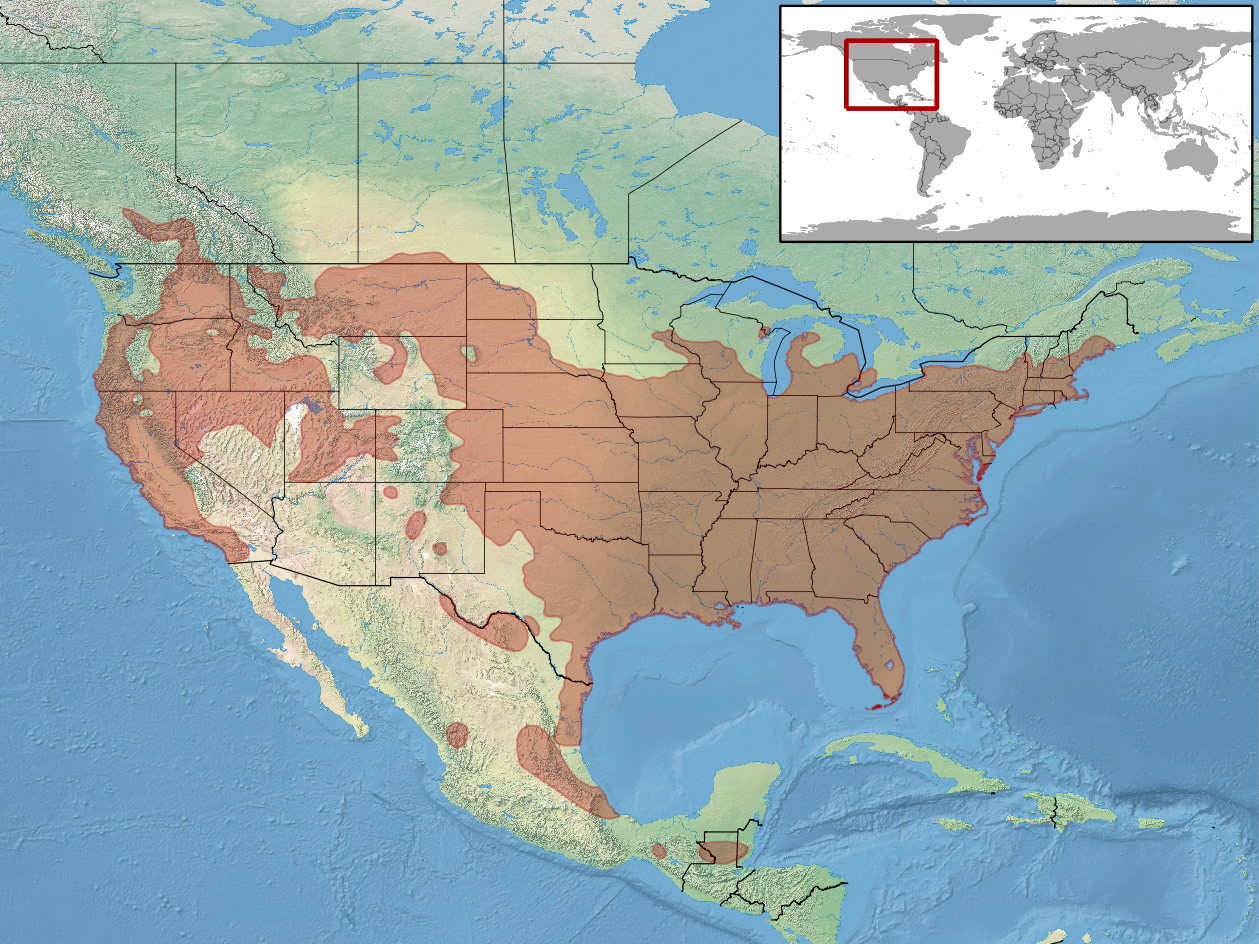

Synonyms
- List: Coluber constrictor Linnaeus, 1758; Bascanion constrictor — Baird & Girard, 1853; Coryphodon constrictor — A.M.C. Duméril & Bibron, 1854; Zamenis constrictor — Boulenger, 1893; Coluber constrictor — Stejneger & Barbour, 1917

= Eastern racer =

Species of snake

The eastern racer, or North American racer (Coluber constrictor), is a species of nonvenomous snake in the subfamily Colubrinae of the family Colubridae. The species is native to North America and Central America. Eleven subspecies, including the nominotypical subspecies, are recognized, which as a group are commonly referred to as the eastern racers. The species is monotypic in the genus Coluber.

== Geographic range ==
Coluber constrictor is found throughout much of the United States, on both sides of the Rocky Mountains, but it also ranges north into Canada and south into Mexico, Guatemala, and Belize.

== Subspecies ==
Image	Subspecies	Common name
	Coluber constrictor anthicus (Cope, 1862)	buttermilk racer
	Coluber constrictor constrictor Linnaeus, 1758	northern black racer
	Coluber constrictor etheridgei Wilson, 1970	tan racer
	Coluber constrictor flaviventris Say, 1823	eastern yellow-bellied racer
	Coluber constrictor foxii (Baird & Girard, 1853)	blue racer
	Coluber constrictor helvigularis Auffenberg, 1955	brown-chinned racer
	Coluber constrictor latrunculus Wilson, 1970	black-masked racer
	Coluber constrictor oaxaca (Jan, 1863)	Mexican racer
	Coluber constrictor paludicola Auffenberg & Babbitt, 1955	Everglades racer
	Coluber constrictor priapus Dunn & Wood, 1939	southern black racer
	Coluber constrictor mormon (Baird & Girard, 1852)	western yellow-bellied racer

== Description ==
Adult eastern racers can typically vary from 50 to 152 cm (20 to 60 in) in total length (tail included) depending on the subspecies, but a record-sized specimen measured 185.4 cm (73.0 in) in total length. A typical adult specimen will weigh around 556 g (1.226 lb), with little size difference between the sexes.

The patterns vary widely among subspecies. Most are solid-colored as their common names imply: black racers, brown racers, tan racers, blue racers, or green racers. "Runner" is sometimes used instead of "racer" in their common names. All subspecies have a lighter-colored underbelly: white, light tan, or yellow in color. Juveniles are more strikingly patterned, with a middorsal row of dark blotches on a light ground color. The tail is unpatterned. As they grow older, the dorsum darkens and the juvenile pattern gradually disappears.

== Behavior ==
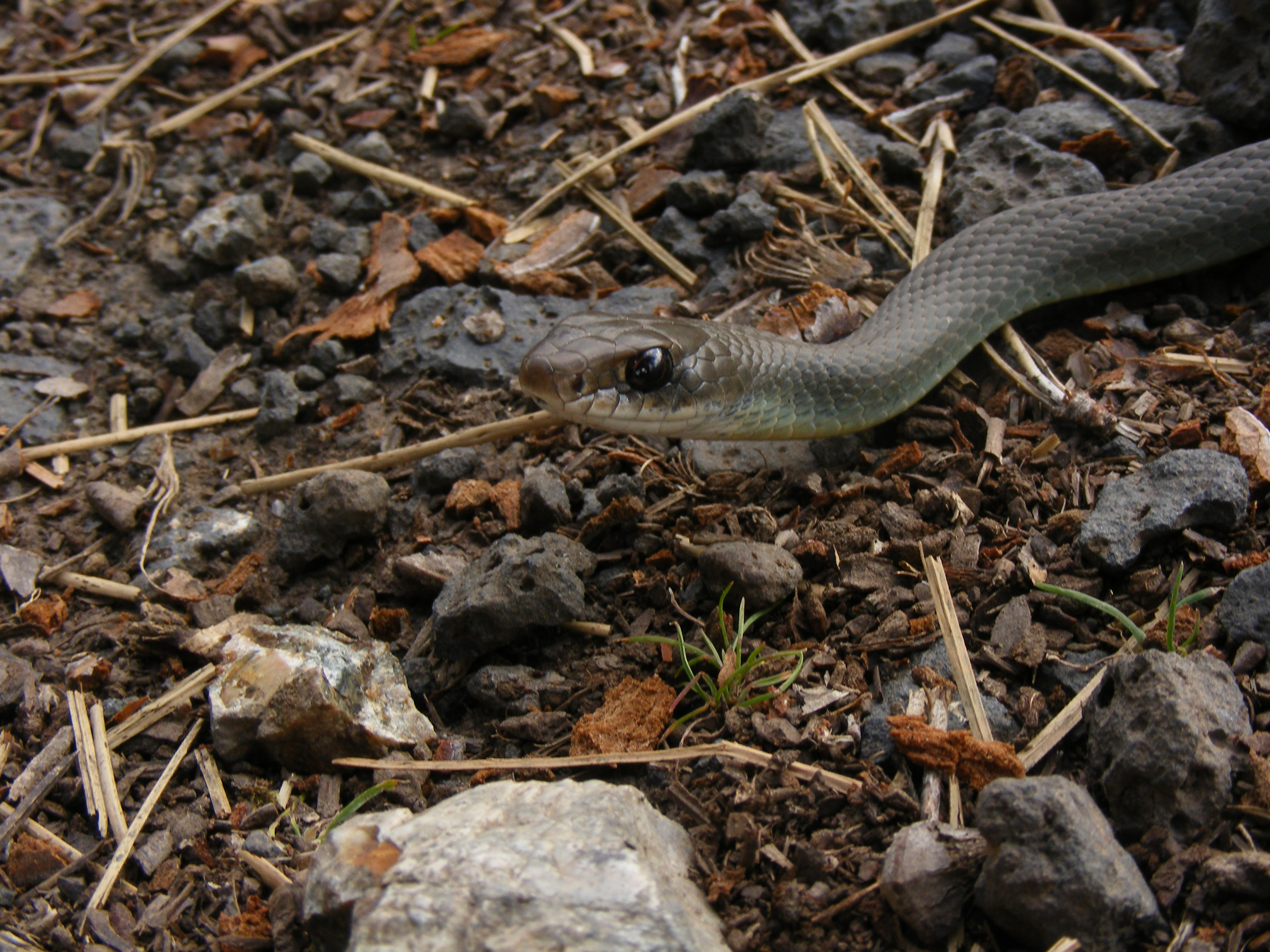
Western yellow-bellied racer (C. c. mormon)

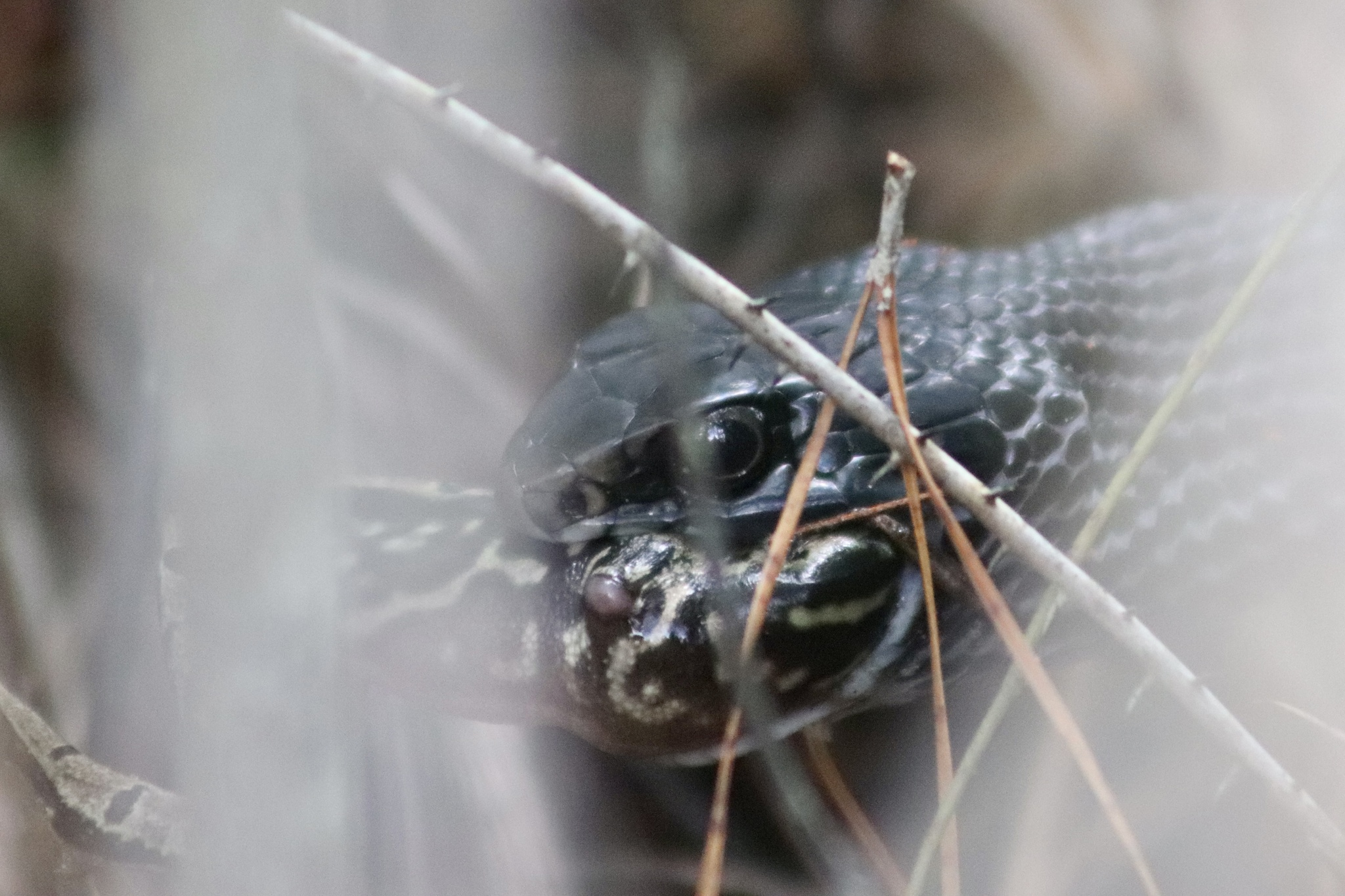
Southern black racer (C. c. priapus) eating a southern leopard frog, in Georgia

The eastern racers are fast-moving, highly active, diurnal snakes. Their diet consists primarily of small rodents, other mammals (as large as small cottontail rabbits), frogs, toads, small turtles, lizards, and other snakes. Some subspecies are known to climb trees to eat eggs and young birds. Juveniles often consume soft-bodied insects and other small invertebrates, as well as small frogs, small reptiles (including lizards and snakes and their eggs), young rodents, and shrews. Despite their specific name, constrictor, they do not really employ constriction, instead simply subduing struggling prey by pinning it bodily, pressing one or two coils against it to hold it in place instead of actually suffocating it. Most smaller prey items are simply swallowed alive.

They are curious snakes with excellent vision. They are visual hunters and hunt exclusively in the daytime and are often seen raising their heads above the ground to get a better view of their surroundings, a behavior dubbed "periscoping" by snake enthusiasts. Aptly named, racers are very fast and typically flee from a potential predator. However, once cornered, they put up a vigorous fight, biting hard and often. They are difficult to handle and will writhe, defecate, and release a foul-smelling musk from their cloacae. Vibrating their tails among dry leaves, racers can sound convincingly like rattlesnakes.

== Habitat ==
Coluber constrictor is found frequently near water, but also in brush, trash piles, roadsides, and swamps, and in suburbia; it is the most common snake in residential neighborhoods in Florida. It spends most of its time on the ground, but it is a good tree climber and may be found in shrubs and trees where bird nests can be raided for eggs and chicks, as well as small adult birds such as finches, canaries, and thrashers.

Most of the eastern racers prefer open, grassland-type habitats where their keen eyesight and speed can be readily used, but they are also found in light forest and even semiarid regions. They are usually not far from an area of cover for hiding.

== Reproduction ==
In Coluber constrictor, mating takes place in the spring from April until early June. Around a month later, the female lays three to 30 eggs in a hidden nest site, such as a hollow log, an abandoned rodent burrow, or under a rock. The juveniles hatch in the early fall. A newborn is 8–10 in (20–26 cm) in total length. Maturity is reached around 2 years old. Eastern racers have been known to lay their eggs in communal sites, where a number of snakes, even those from other species, all lay their eggs together.

== Symbol ==
The northern black racer is the state reptile of Ohio.

== Gallery ==
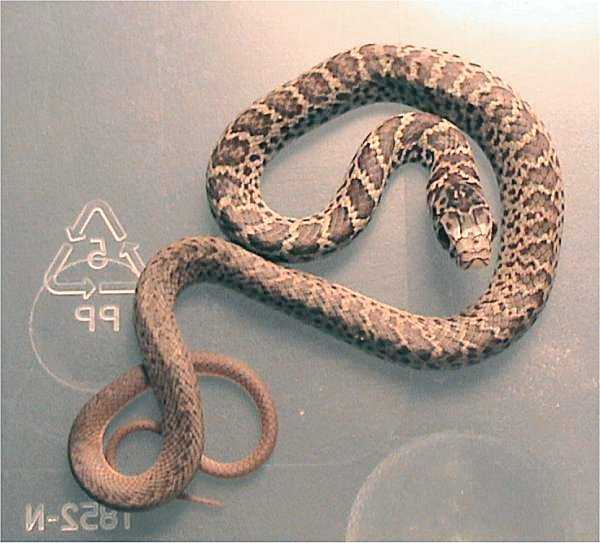
Juvenile eastern yellow-bellied racer, C. c. flaviventris

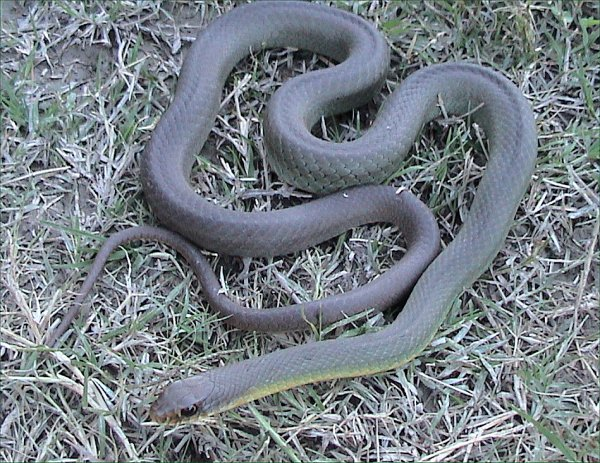
Adult eastern yellow-bellied racer, C. c. flaviventris

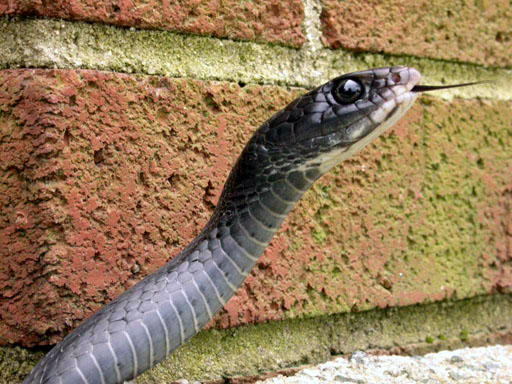
Adult northern black racer, C. c. constrictor

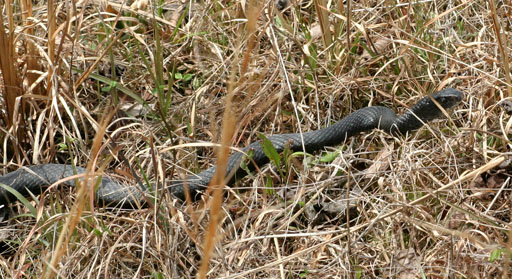
Adult northern black racer, C. c. constrictor, in typical habitat

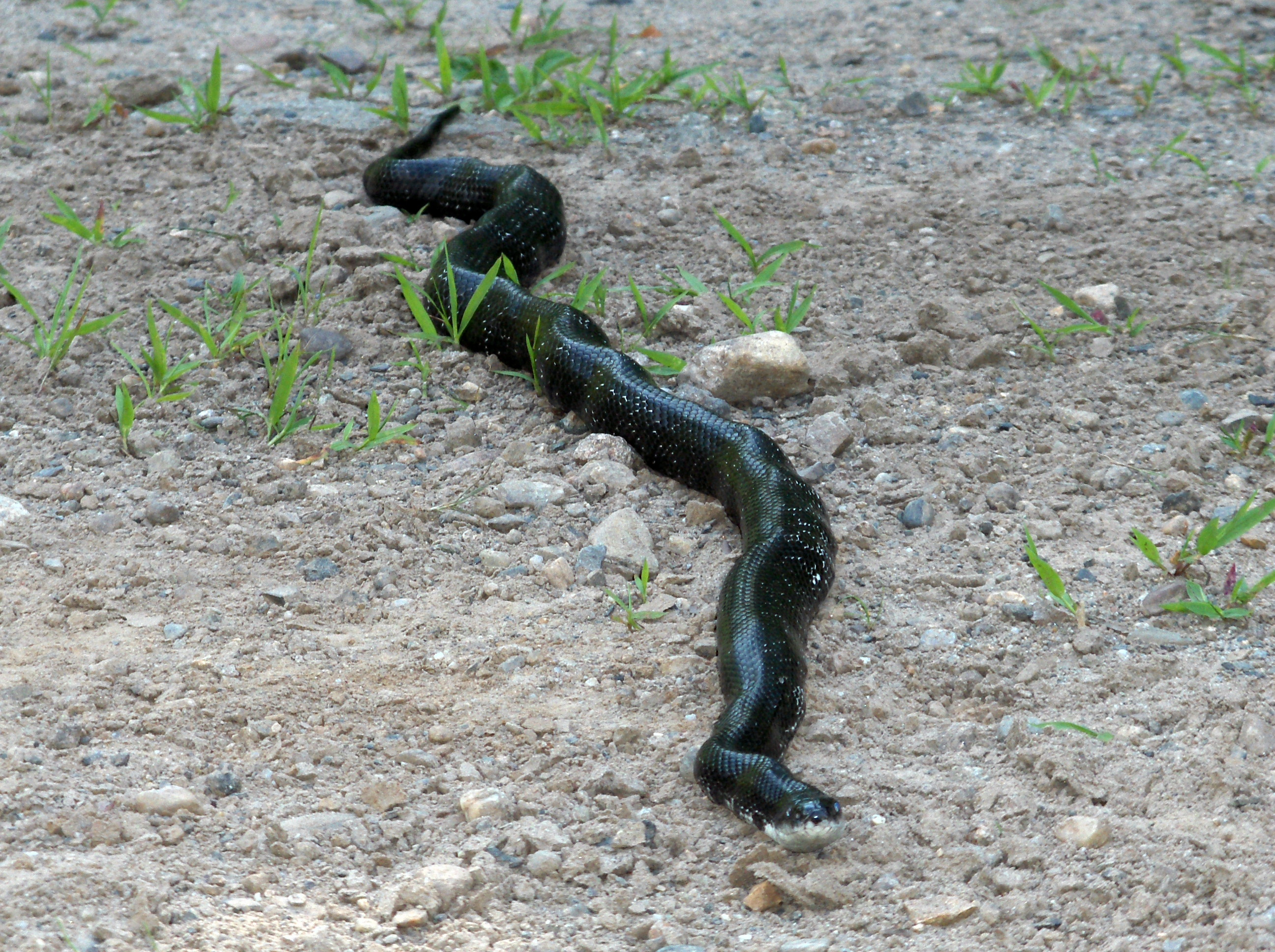
Adult black rat snake, Pantherophis obsoletus, often confused with the northern black racer

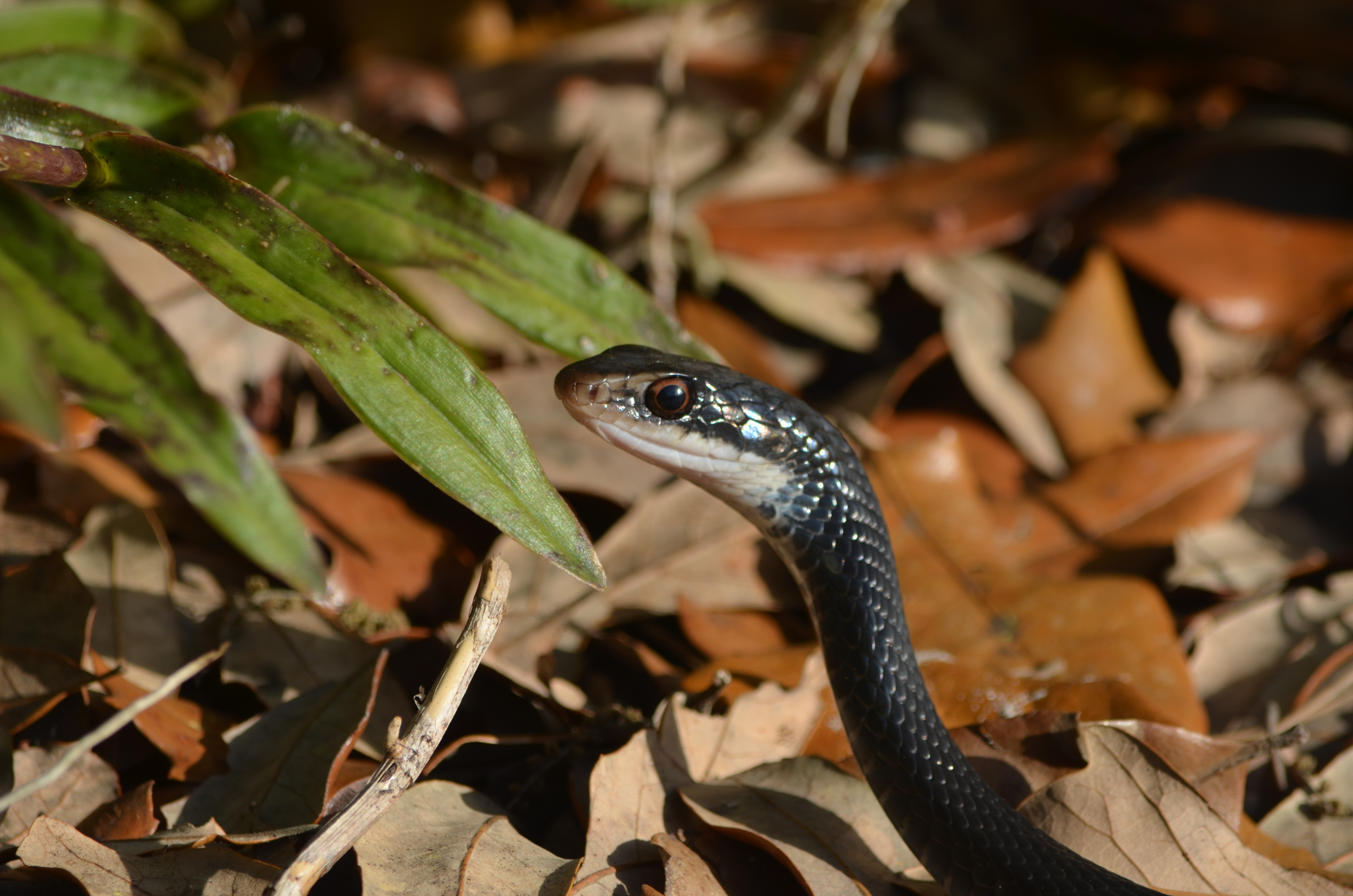
Close up of adult southern black racer, C. c. priapus, showing the iridescence of its scales
