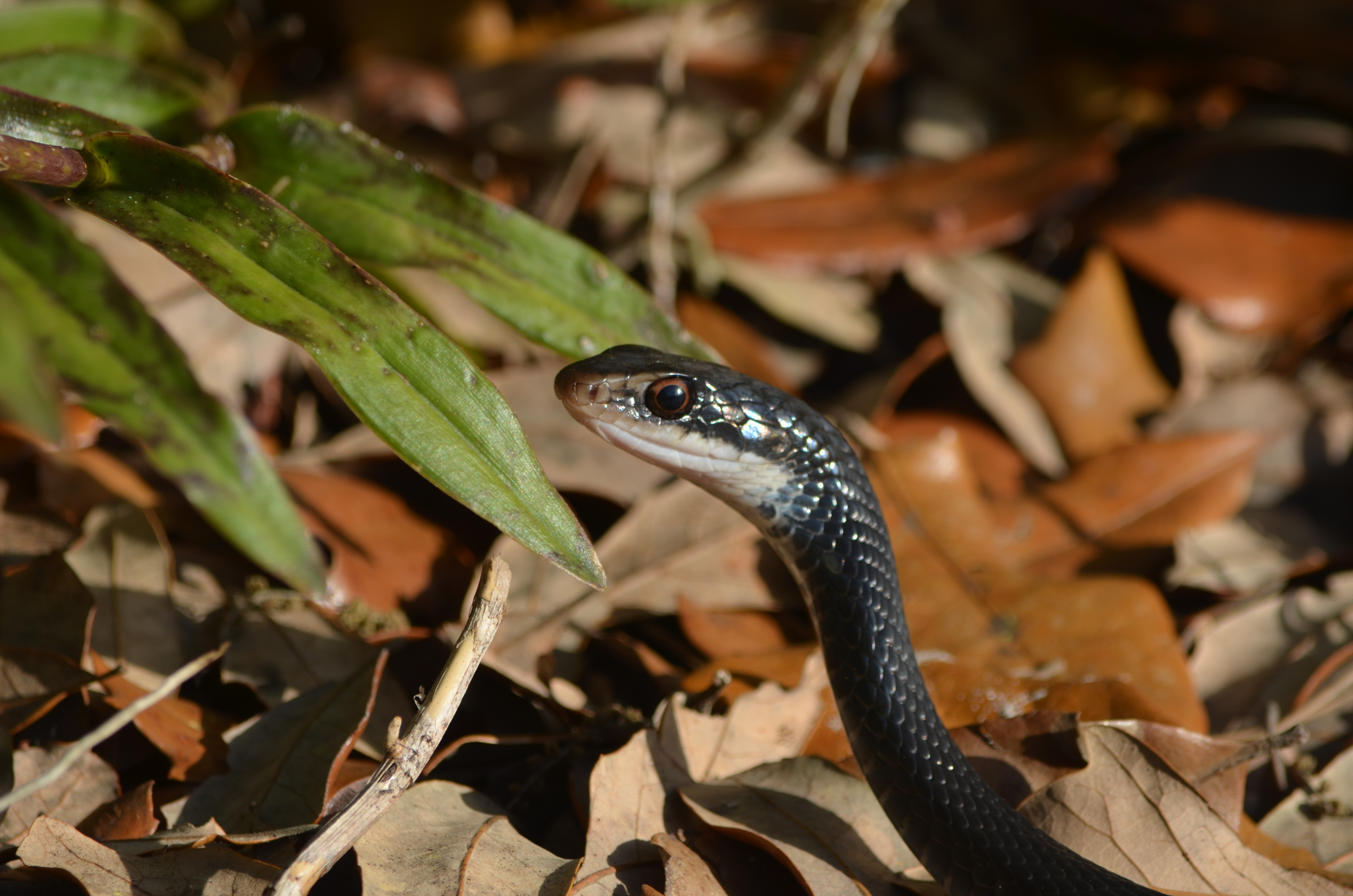

Scientific classification
- Kingdom: Animalia
- Phylum: Chordata
- Order: Squamata
- Suborder: Serpentes
- Family: Colubridae
- Genus: Coluber
- Species: C. constrictor
- Subspecies: C. c. priapus

Trinomial name
- Coluber constrictor priapus Dunn & Wood, 1939

= Southern black racer =

Subspecies of snake

The southern black racer (Coluber constrictor priapus) is one of the more common subspecies of the nonvenomous Coluber constrictor snake species of the Southeastern United States. The subspecific name priapus refers to the proximal spines of the hemipenes being much enlarged into basal hooks, which is characteristic of this subspecies. These snakes are quite active during the day, which increases the chance of sightings. They eat almost any animal they can overpower, including rodents, frogs, toads, and lizards. Members of this species generally do not tolerate handling – even after months in captivity – and typically strike and flail wildly every time they are handled, often defecating a foul-smelling musk, a common defense against predators in snakes. Adults of the species are usually thin with a jet-black dorsal side with a grey belly and white chin. They are quite fast, giving them the name "racer".

== Description ==
Typical size for this snake is 51–142 cm (20–56 in), and the record is 180 cm (72 in). The southern black racer has a white chin, whereas an indigo snake normally has a dark to reddish-orange chin.

== Diet ==
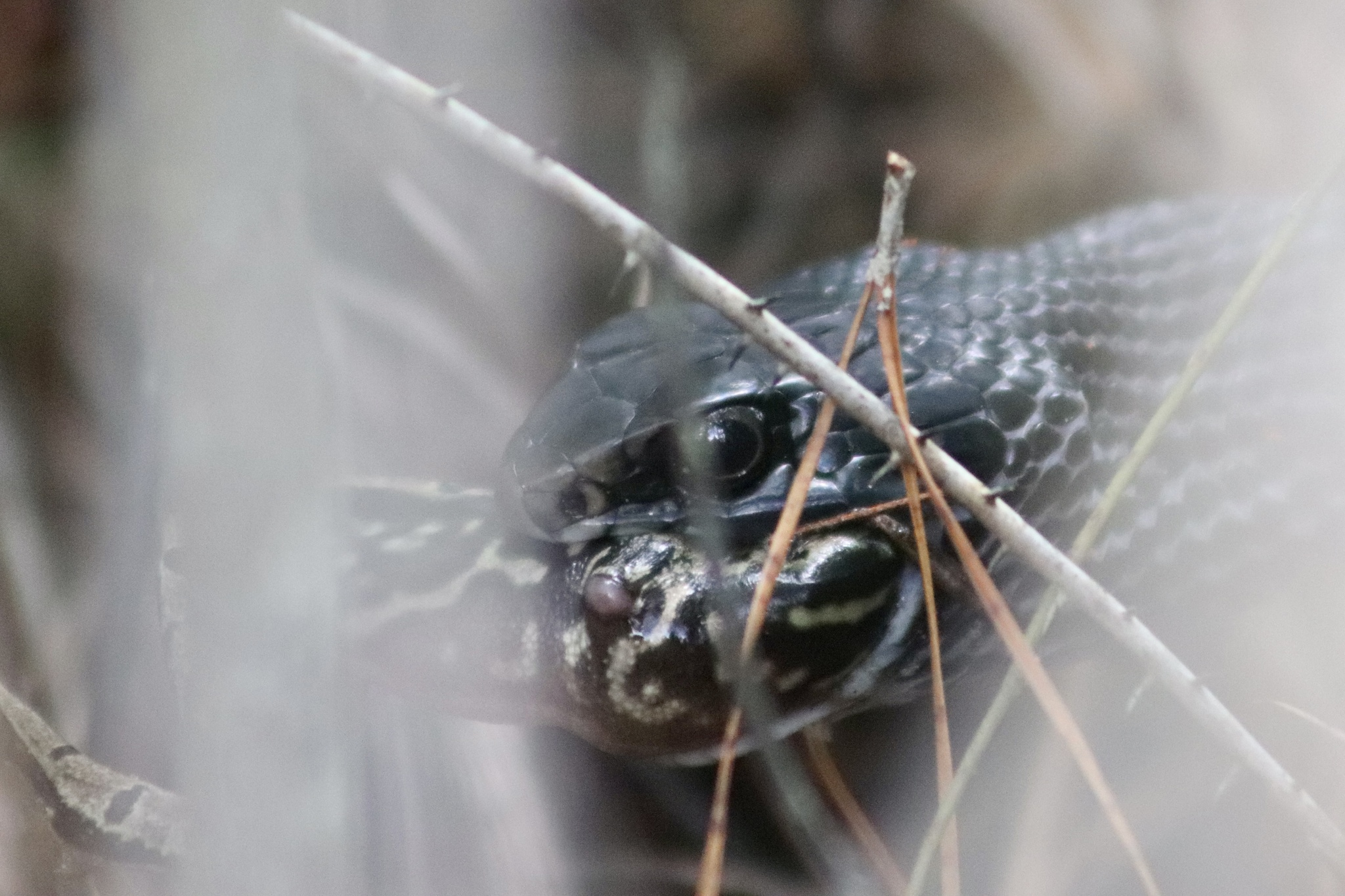
Eating a southern leopard frog

The southern black racer is a predator that relies on lizards, insects, moles, birds, eggs, small snakes, rodents, and frogs. Despite its specific name constrictor (scientific name: Coluber constrictor), the racer is more likely to suffocate or crush its victim into the ground, rather than coiling around it in typical constrictor fashion.

== Mortality ==
Humans remain the greatest threat to black racers. Many are killed on highways and others are intentionally killed out of fear. The southern black racer can be mistaken for a cottonmouth – a venomous snake more commonly called a water moccasin. The venomous snake has a white lining inside of its mouth. Racers are nonvenomous and do not breed with cottonmouths. Natural enemies include such birds of prey as hawks, including the red-shouldered hawk and broad-winged hawk. These perching and soaring birds have keen eyesight and drop down to capture black racers and other snakes in a manner that makes the snake's speed and ground awareness ineffective.

== Gallery ==
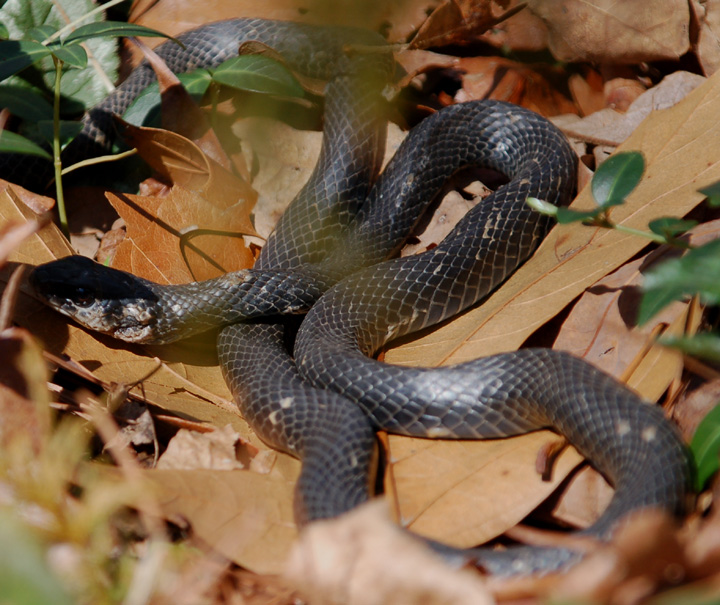
Black racers wait for prey in dry leaves and brush.

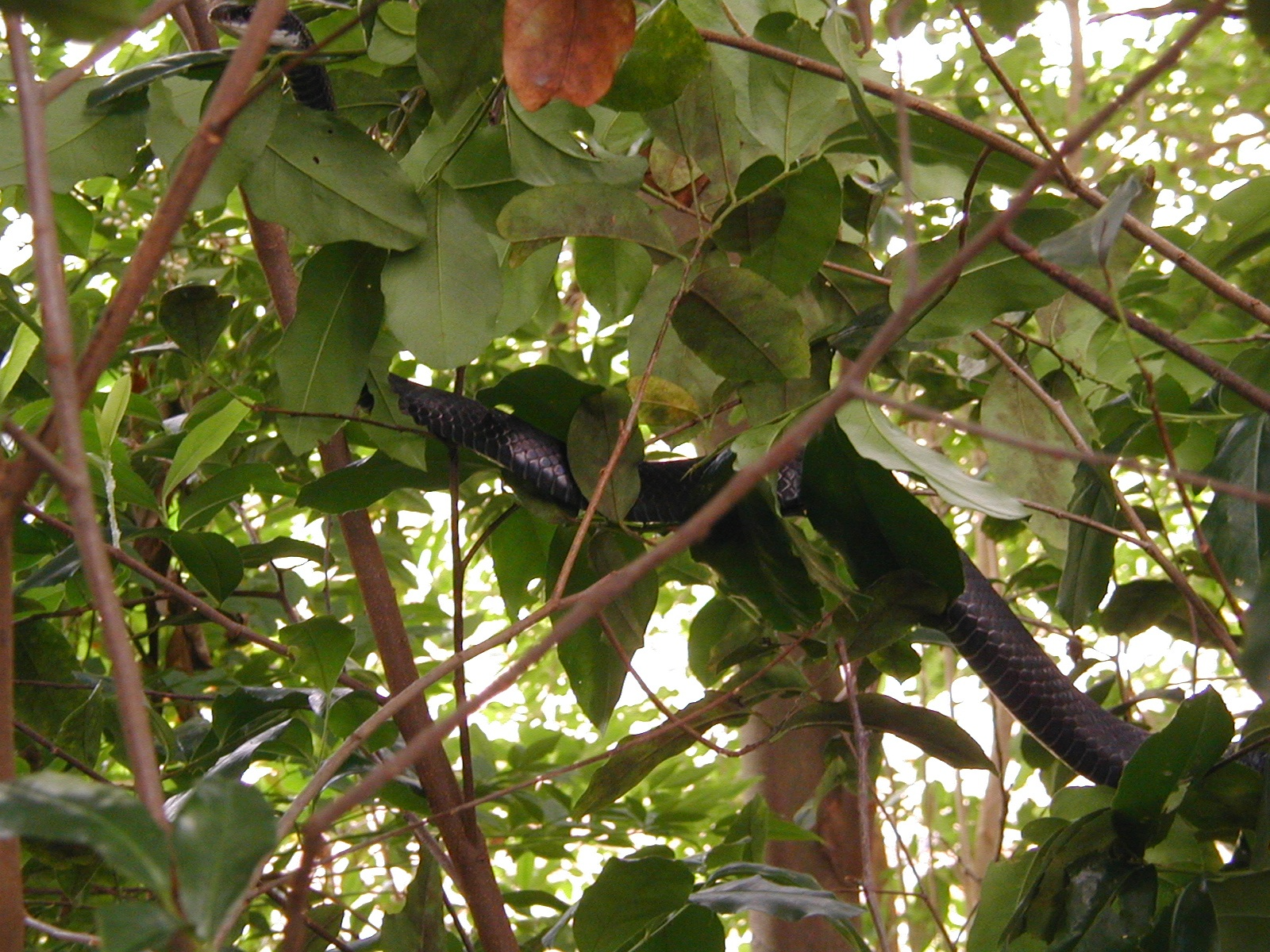
Black racers are excellent climbers.

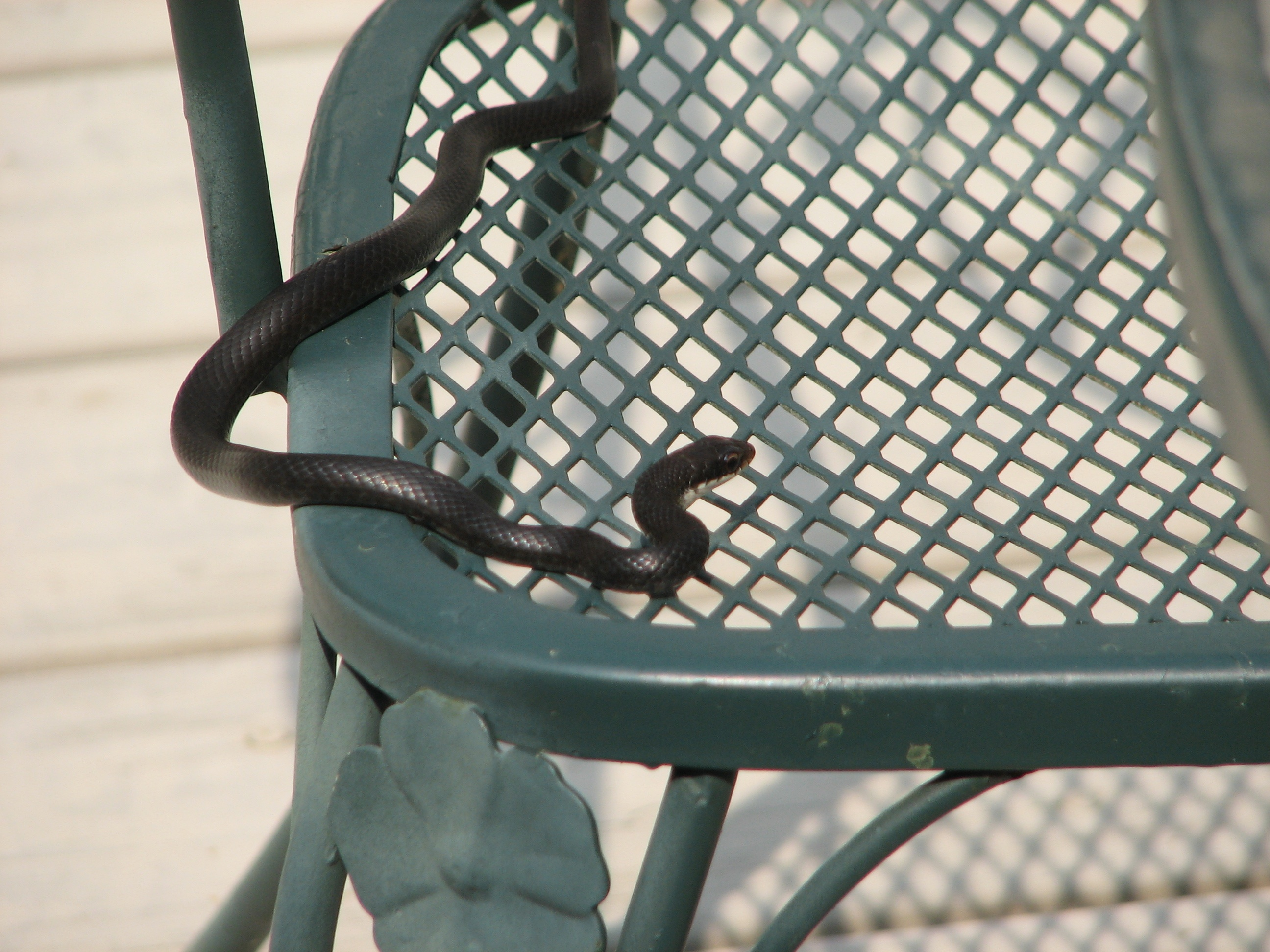
Black racers are not strangers to suburban yards.

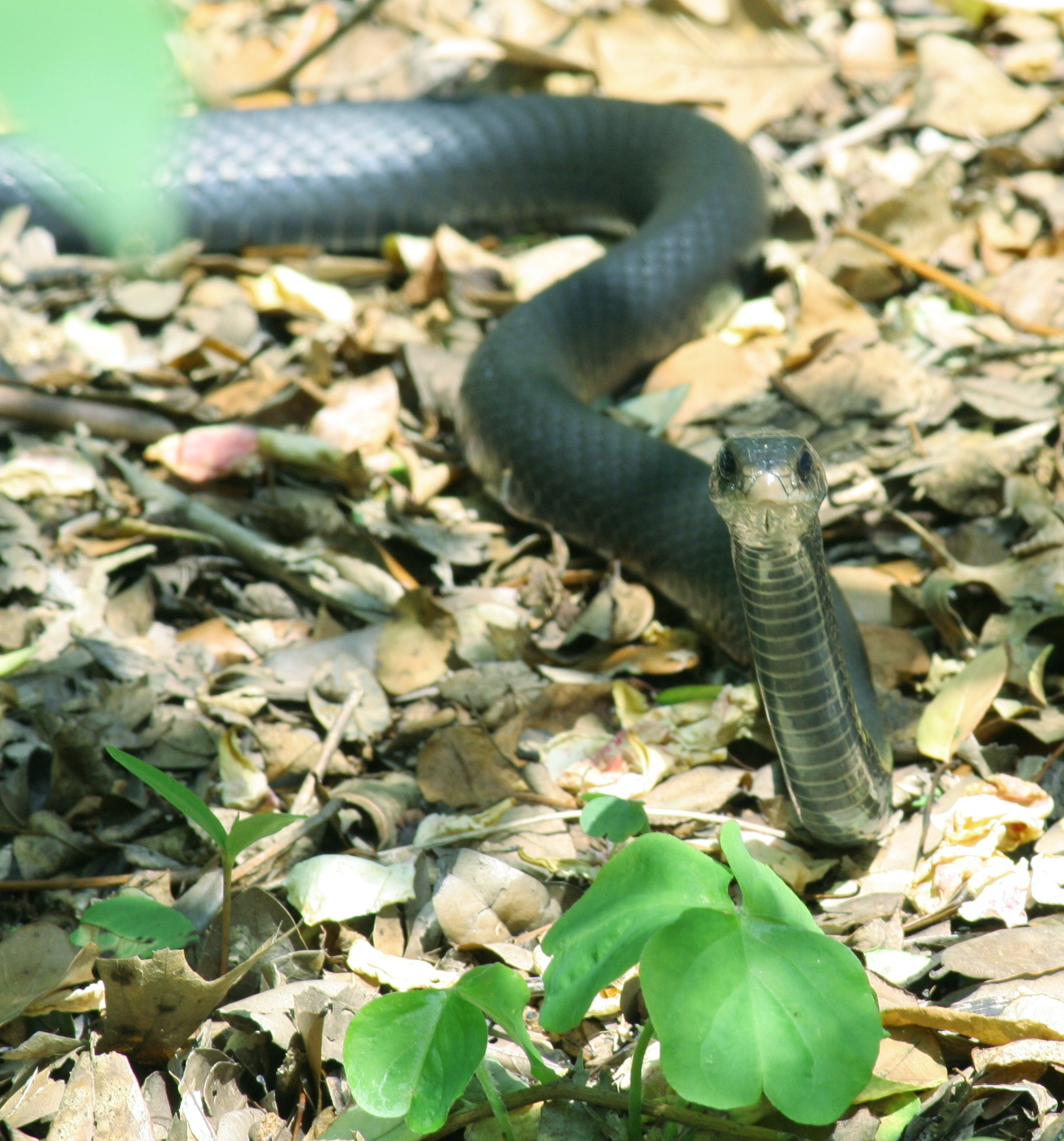
Black racer with head elevated

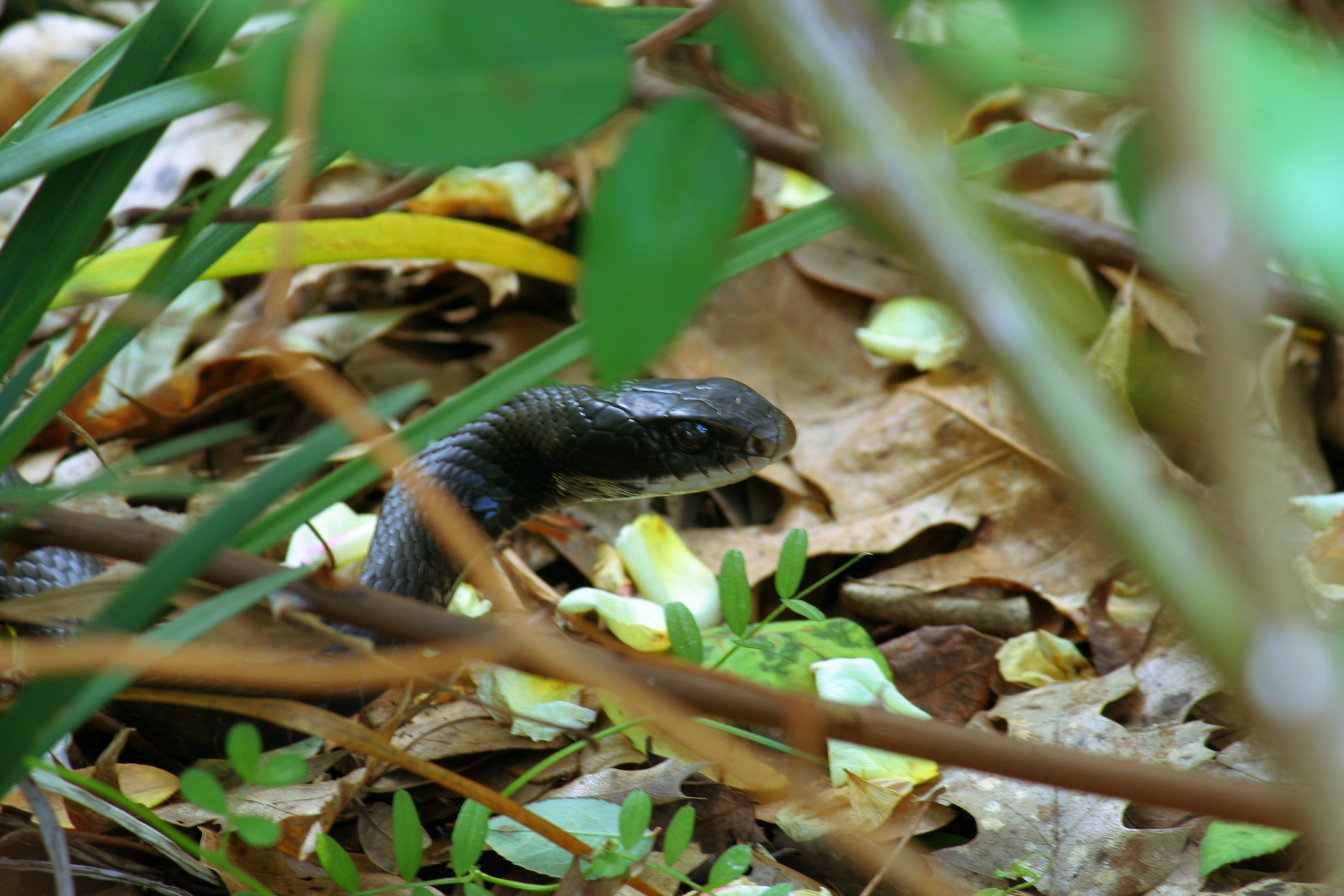
Black racer

Like most cold-blooded creatures, the black racer relies on sun and shade to regulate its temperature.

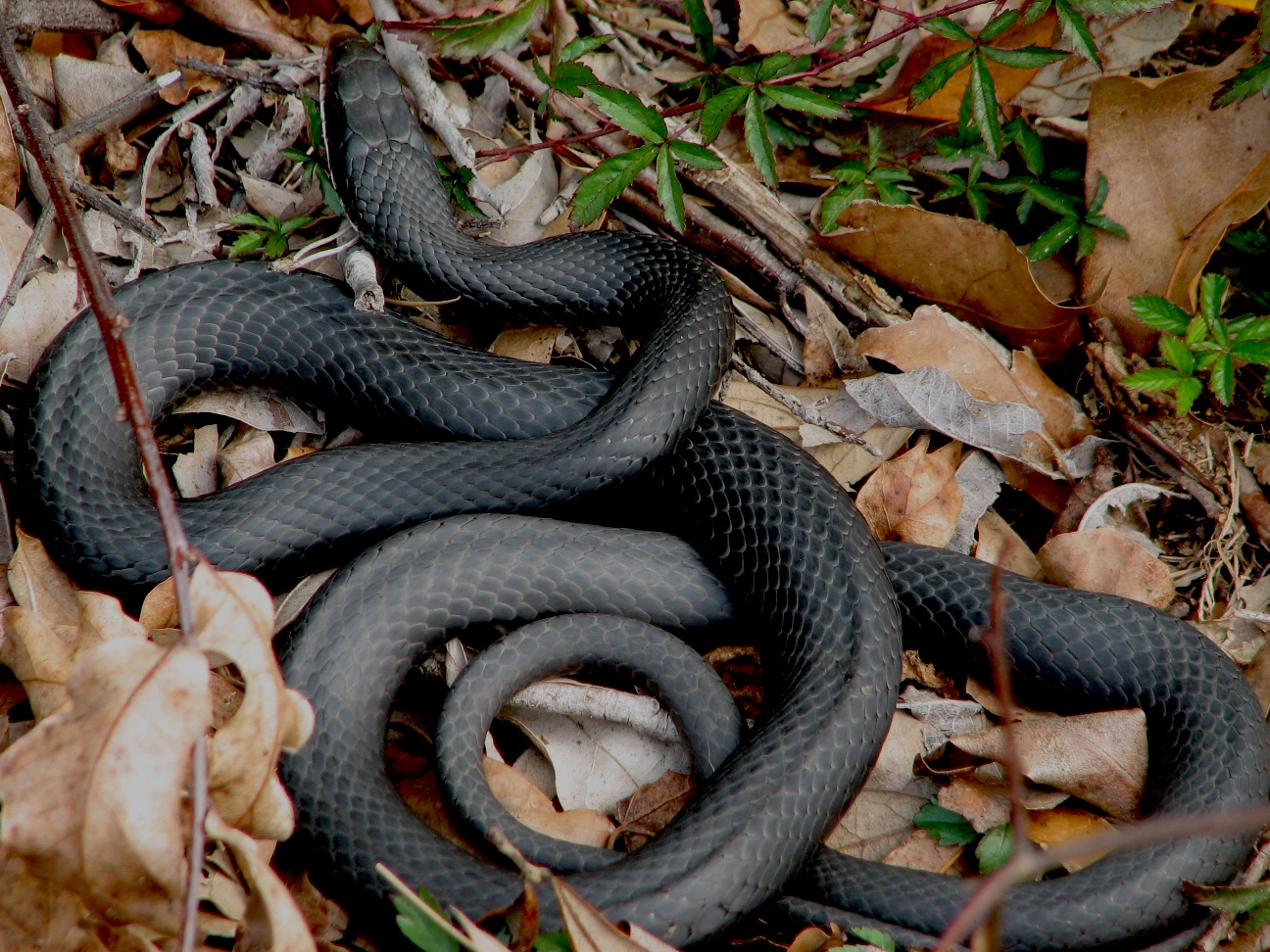
Note the white marking around the mouth.

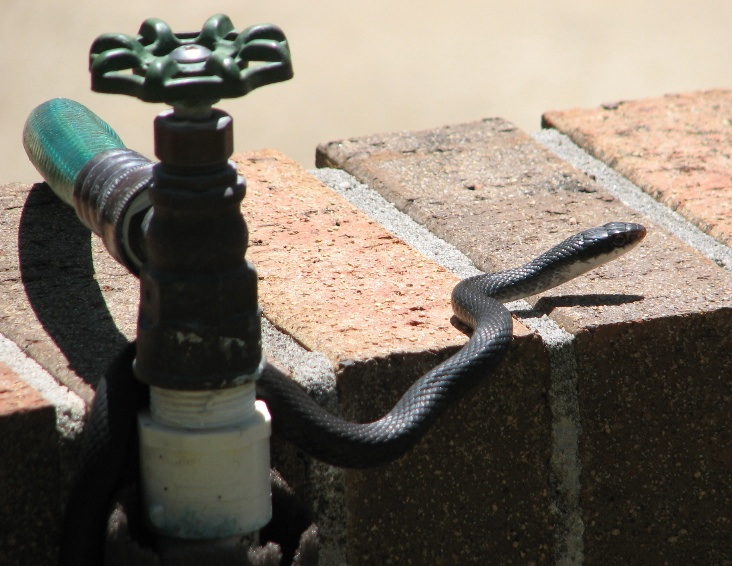
A black racer examines a green hose.

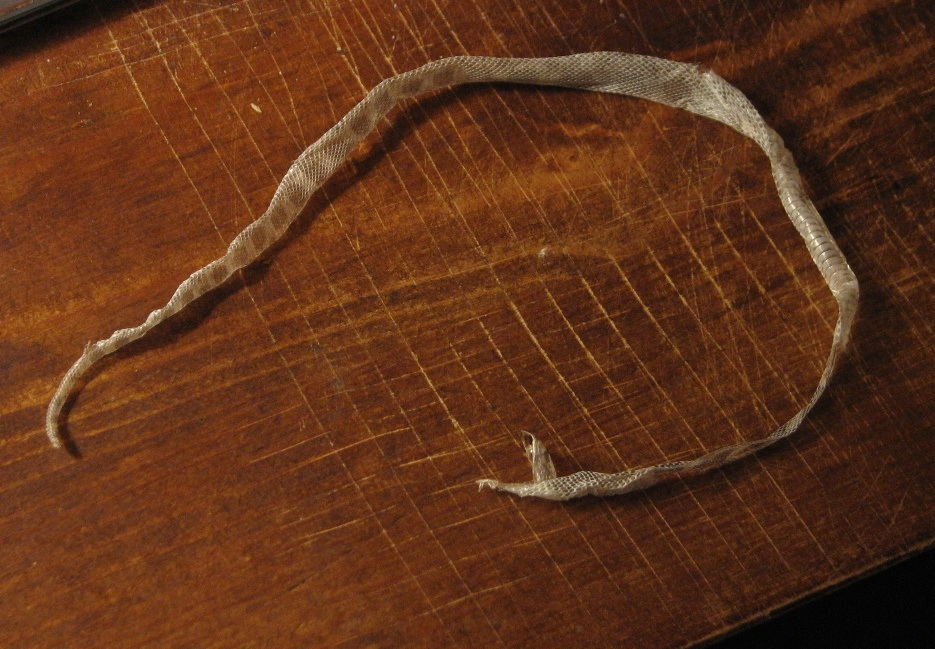
A 24-in shed racer skin

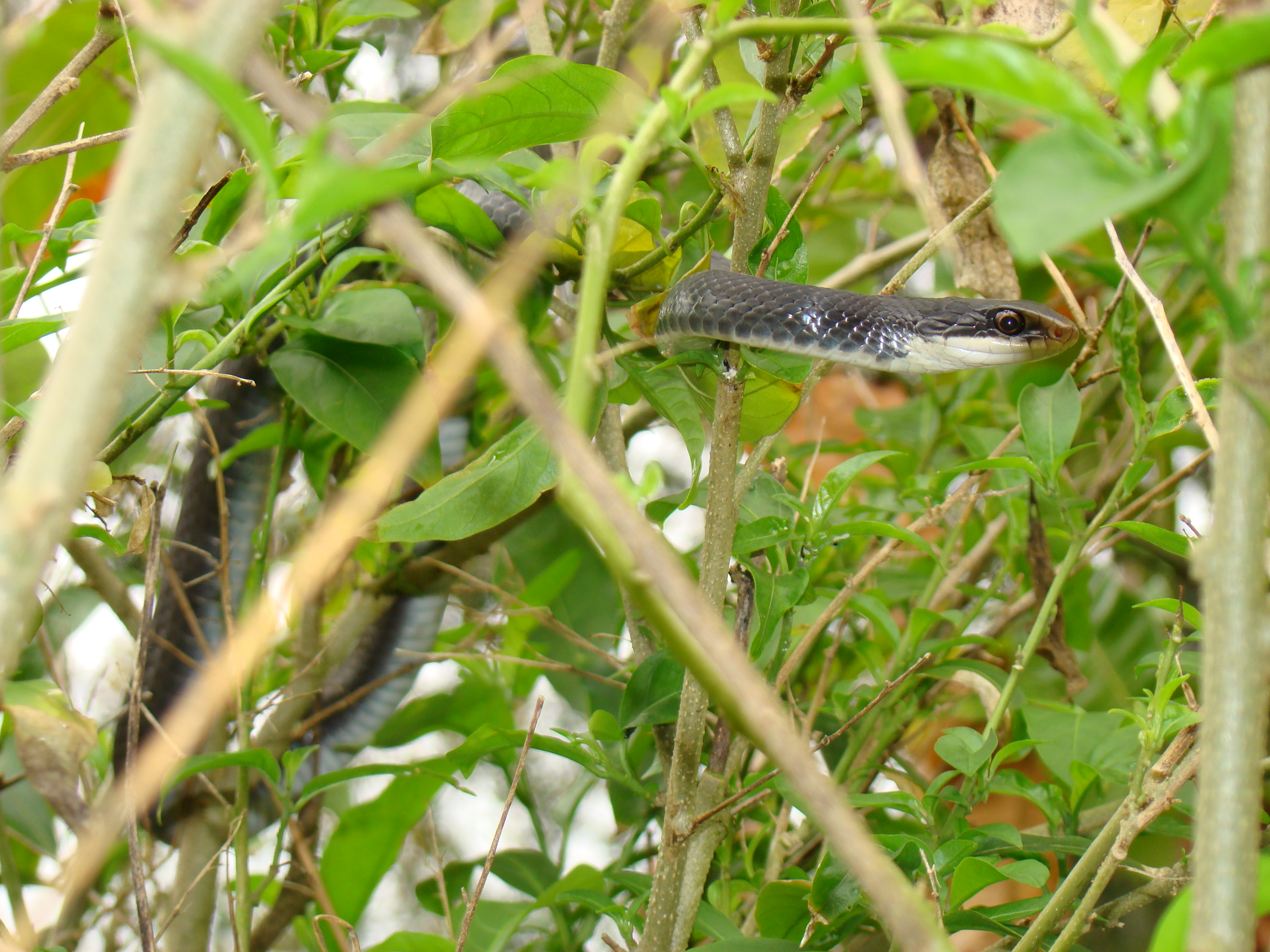
Stalking a dragonfly

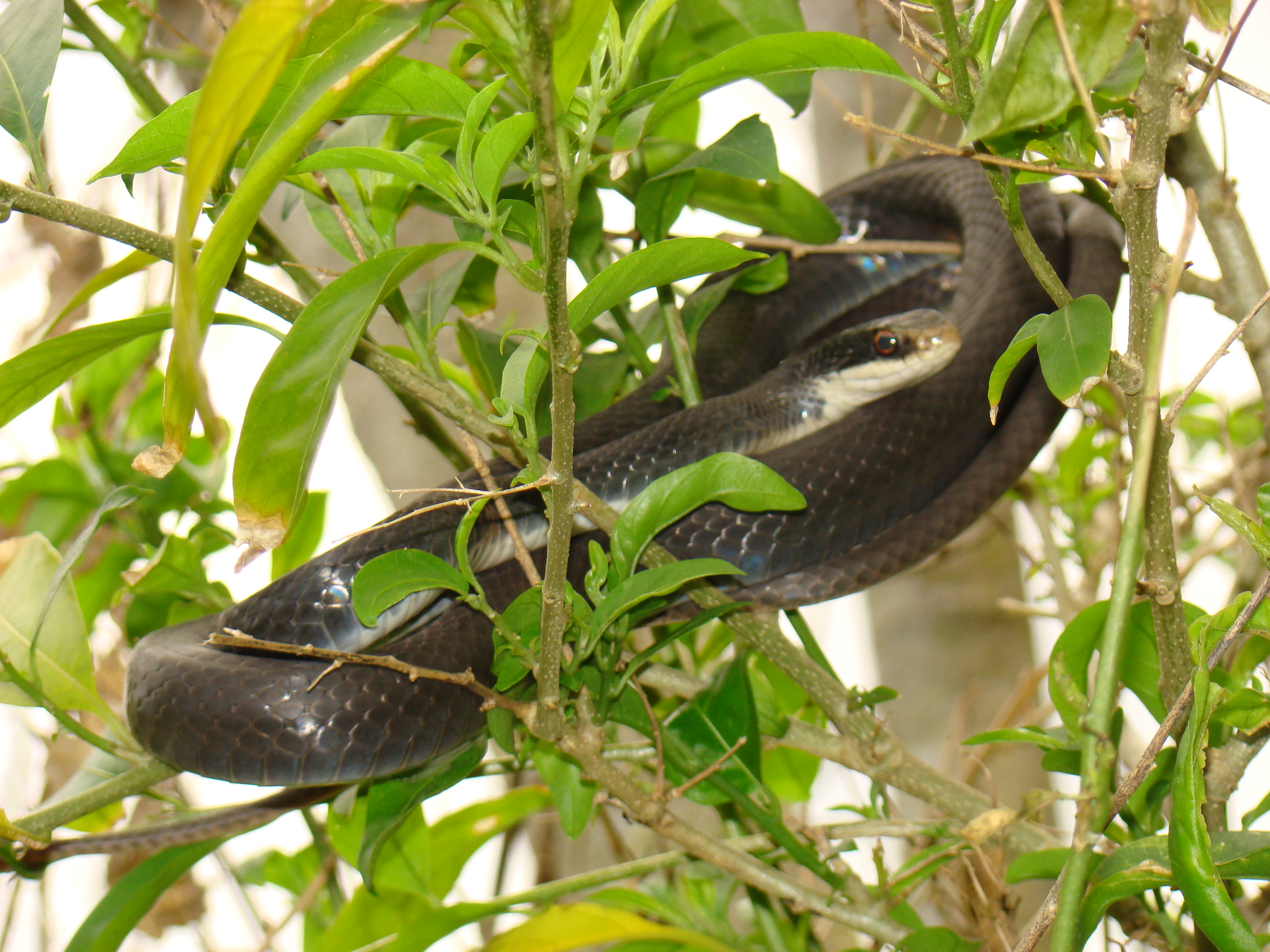
Resting and waiting for food from a tree

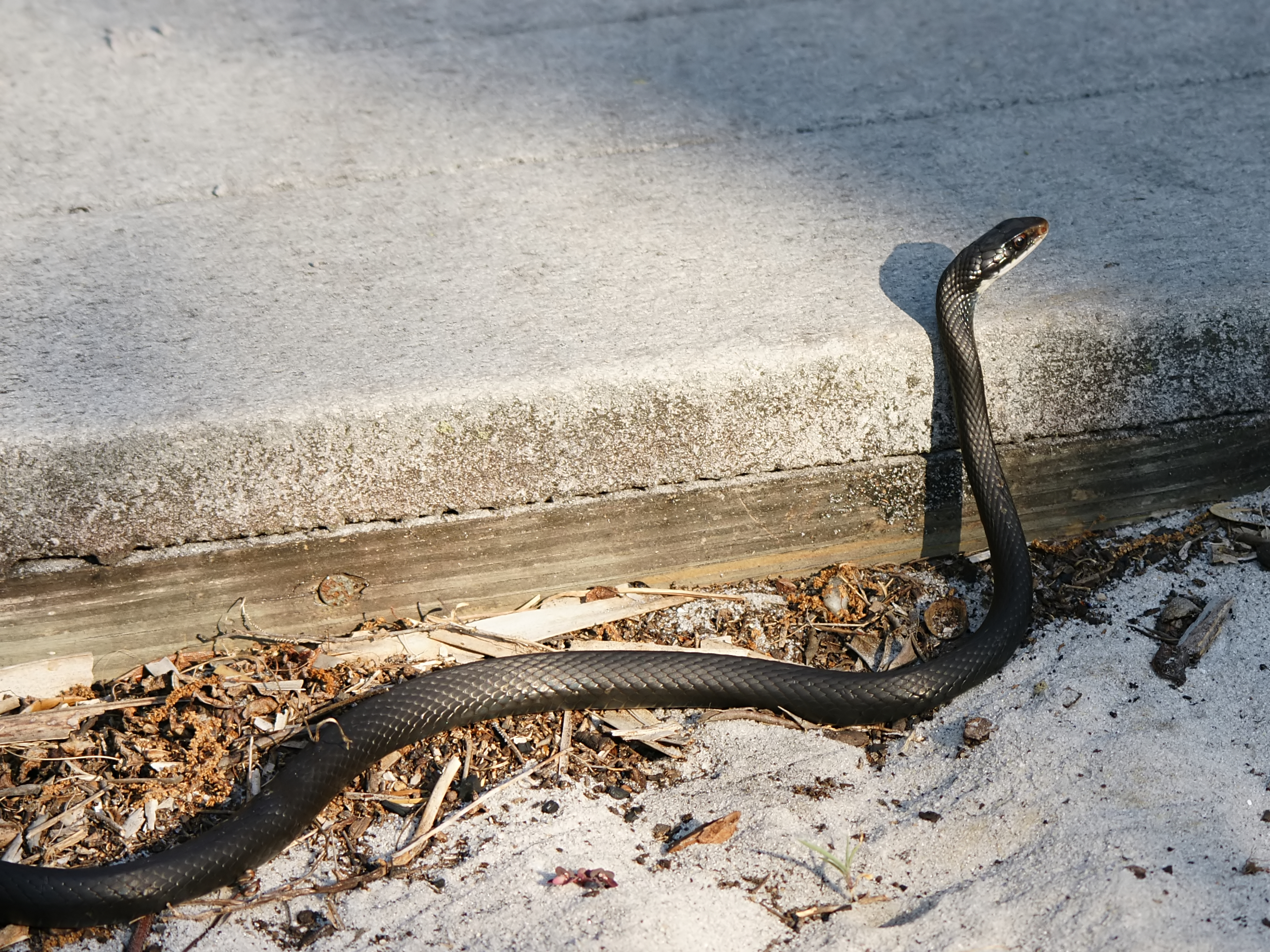
Southern black racer at St. Sebastian River Preserve State Park in Indian River County, Florida
