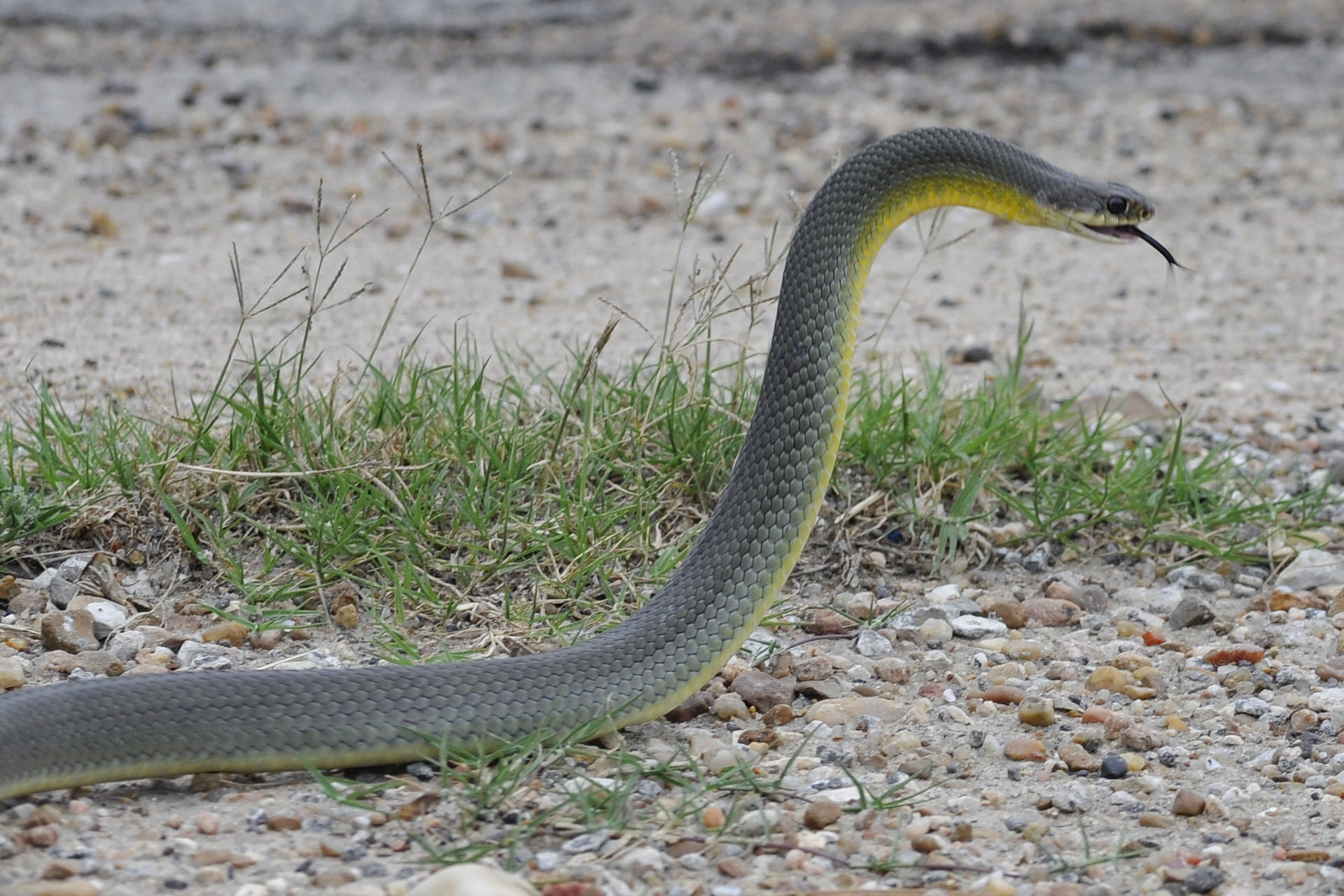
- Eastern yellow-bellied racer

Scientific classification
- Kingdom: Animalia
- Phylum: Chordata
- Class: Reptilia
- Order: Squamata
- Suborder: Serpentes
- Family: Colubridae
- Genus: Coluber
- Species: C. constrictor
- Subspecies: C. c. flaviventris

Trinomial name
- Coluber constrictor flaviventris Say, 1823

Synonyms
- List: Coluber flaviventris Say, 1823; Bascanion flaviventris — Baird & Girard, 1853; Coryphodon flaviventris — Hallowell, 1856; Coluber constrictor var. flaviventris — Garman, 1883; Coluber constrictor flaviventris — Grant, 1937

= Coluber constrictor flaviventris =

Subspecies of snake

Coluber constrictor flaviventris, commonly known as the eastern yellow-bellied racer, is a subspecies of the eastern racer, a non-venomous colubrid snake. It is endemic to North America.

== Description ==
The eastern yellow-bellied racer is a thin-bodied snake, capable of attaining a total length of 1.5 metres (60 inches). As an adult, its color is an olive grey-green with a yellow underside. As a juvenile it is remarkably different, having a tan or cream-colored body with brown or grey blotches. The color gradually changes as the snake ages, becoming solid olive grey-green. Authors disagree as to when this transformation is complete, from 1½ to three years old, and from 18 to 30 inches (46–76 cm) in total length.

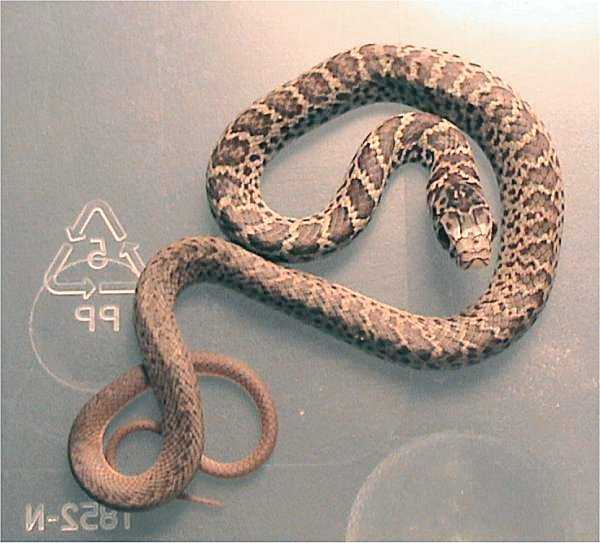
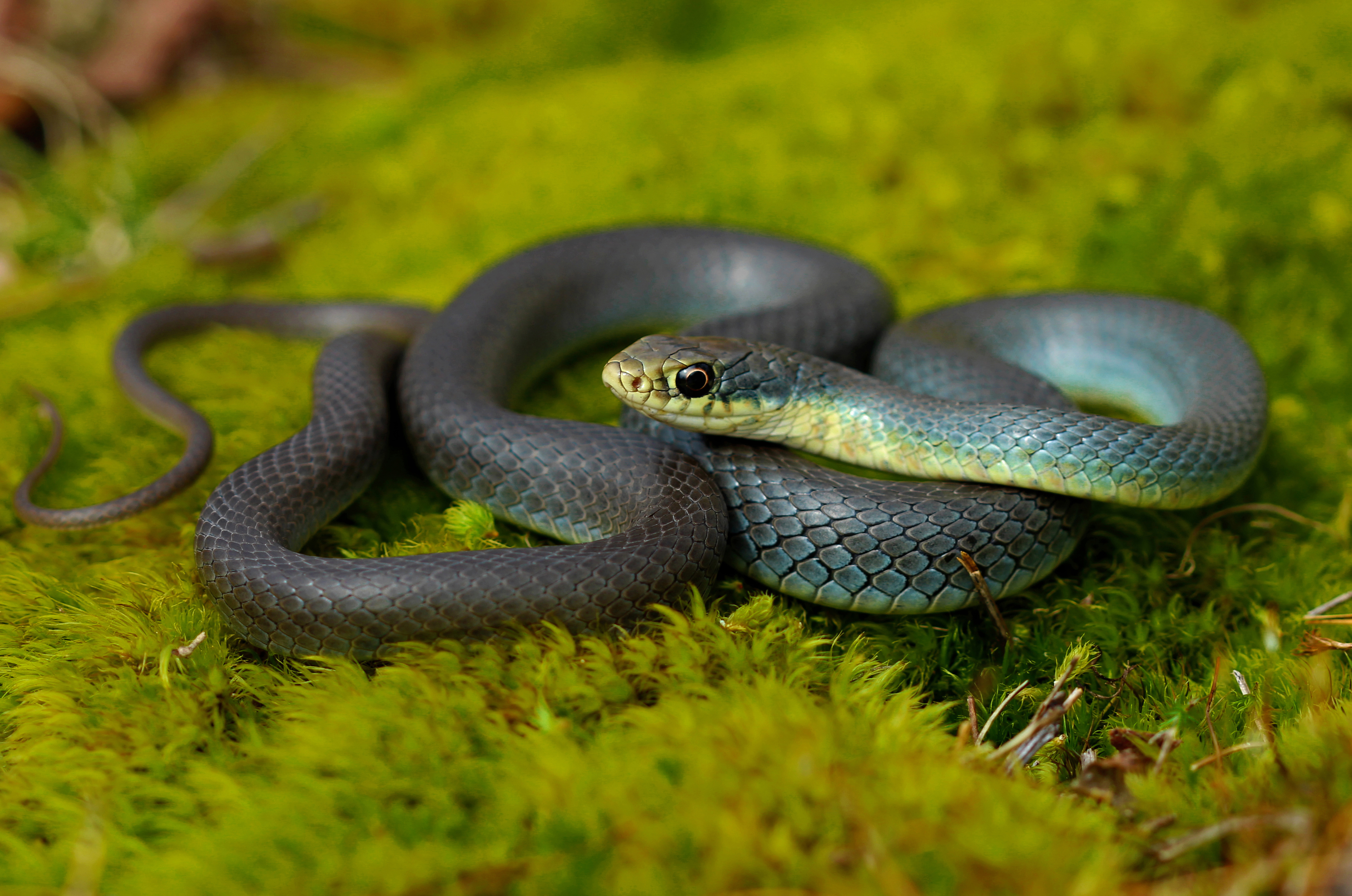
C. c. flaviventris juvenile (left) and adult (right)

== Distribution ==
The eastern yellow-bellied racer is found in the United States, from the states of Montana, North Dakota, South Dakota, east to Iowa, south to Texas and southeast to Louisiana. It is also found in isolated populations in Canada.

== Behavior ==
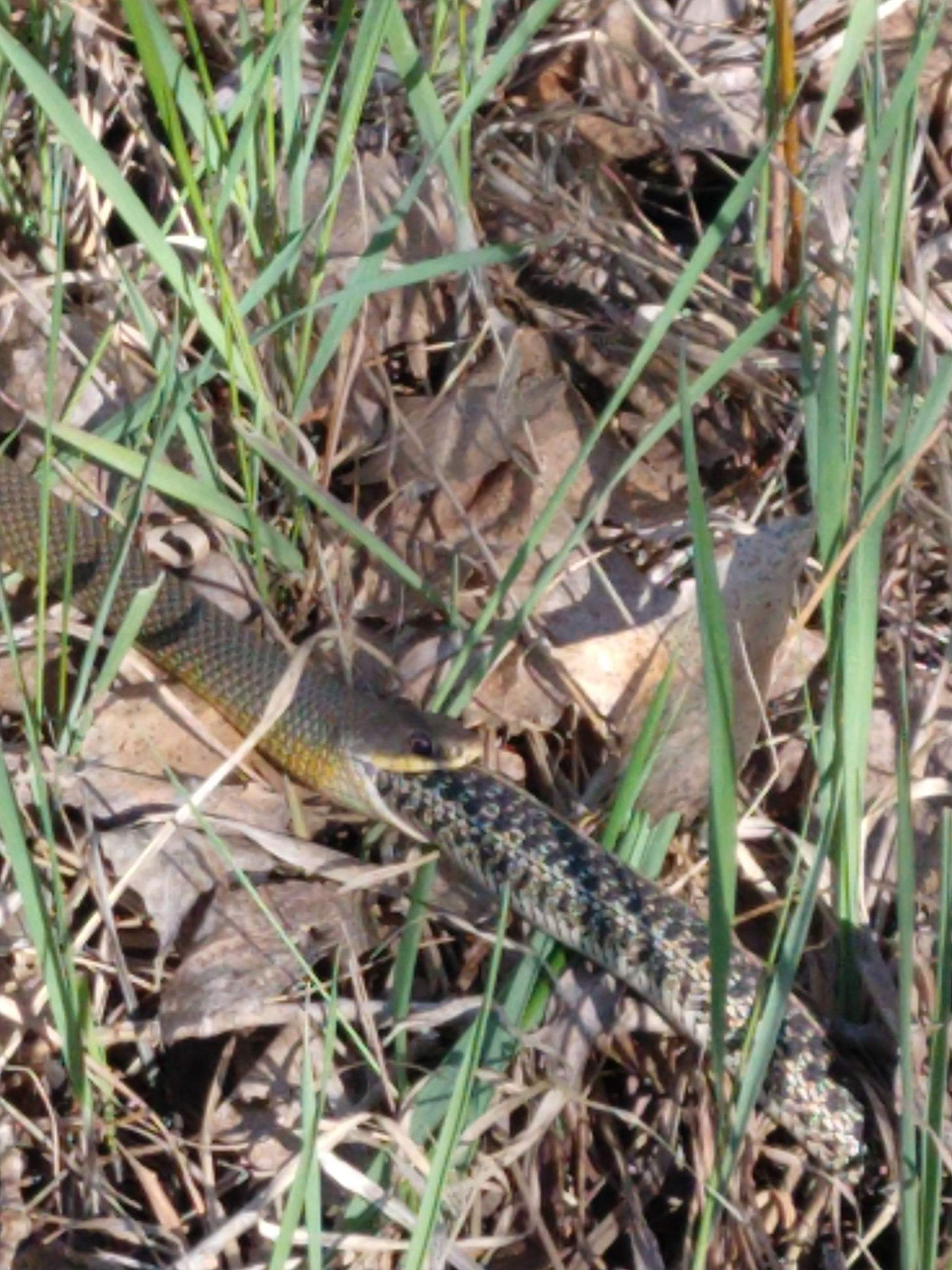
Eating a plains garter snake

Racers are diurnal, active predators. They are fast moving and are often quick to bite if handled. They generally eat rodents, lizards and frogs, but as juveniles they will also consume various kinds of soft-bodied insects. They are fairly nervous snakes, and as such, do not typically fare well in captivity.

== Conservation status ==
Coluber constrictor flaviventris is listed as an endangered species in the province of Saskatchewan.
