= Lavagna (surname) =

Lavagna is an Italian surname. Notable people with the surname include:

- Attilio Lavagna (1872 – 1938), Italian educator
- Roberto Lavagna (born 1942), Argentine economist and politician
- Marco Lavagna (born 1974), Argentine economist and politician

== See also ==
- Lavagna
- Lavagna (river)
