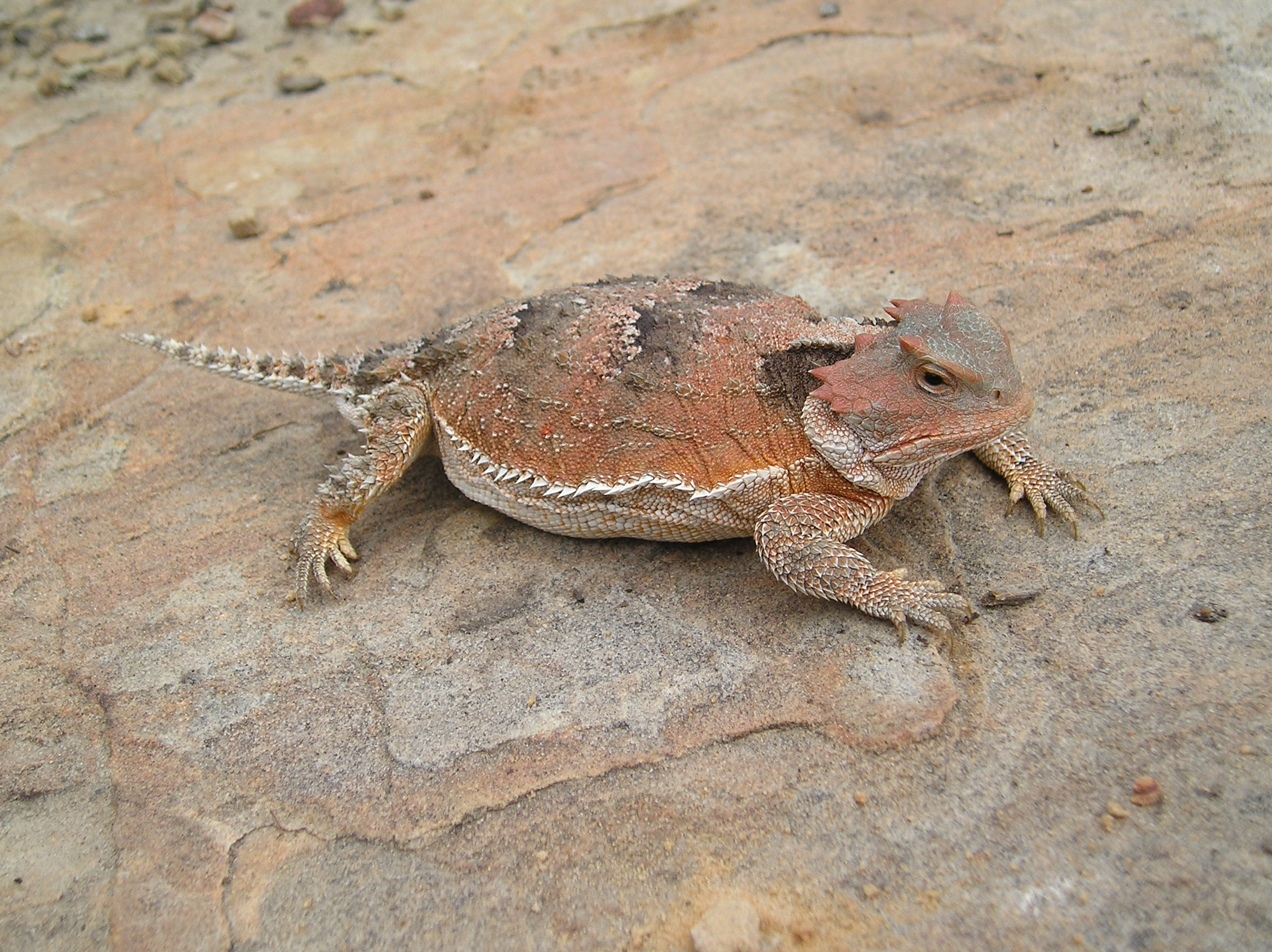
- Gravid female greater short-horned lizard in the Mogollon Rim region of Payson, Arizona

Conservation status
- Least Concern (IUCN 3.1)

Scientific classification
- Kingdom: Animalia
- Phylum: Chordata
- Class: Reptilia
- Order: Squamata
- Suborder: Iguania
- Family: Phrynosomatidae
- Genus: Phrynosoma
- Species: P. hernandesi

Binomial name
- Phrynosoma hernandesi Girard, 1858

= Greater short-horned lizard =

Species of reptile

The greater short-horned lizard (Phrynosoma hernandesi), also commonly known as the mountain short-horned lizard or Hernández's short-horned lizard, is a species of lizard in the family Phrynosomatidae. The species is endemic to western North America. Like other horned lizards, it is often called a "horned toad" or "horny toad", but it is not a toad at all. It is a reptile, not an amphibian. It is one of five native species of lizards in Canada.

== Etymology ==
The genus Phrynosoma, means toad-bodied. The specific name, hernandesi, honors Francisco Hernández (1514–1587), a Spanish physician who wrote an early account of a horned lizard, which was published in 1615.

== Distribution ==
The greater short-horned lizard is the most widely distributed horned lizard in North America and occurs in the widest range of habitats: West into central Nevada, east into North and South Dakota, north to southern Saskatchewan and Alberta, and then south into eastern New Mexico to central Mexico, with a few pockets in Trans-Pecos Texas. This species of lizard is mostly an arid mountain dweller living in the range of 900–11,300 feet (170–3440 m). It is the only member of its genus in Wyoming, which counts Phrynosoma as its state reptile. It is also considered an endangered species in Saskatchewan and Alberta.

== Habitat ==
The greater short-horned lizard occupies habitats from semiarid plains to high elevations in the mountains. This species is frequently found in a wide range of habitats like shortgrass prairies, sagebrush deserts, and juniper, pine, or fir forests. The soil in these habitats can be stony or rocky but usually has fine loose soil or sand present.

The greater short-horned lizard is more cold tolerant than other species and is able to reach higher elevations and a greater distribution where the temperature is much cooler.

== Description ==
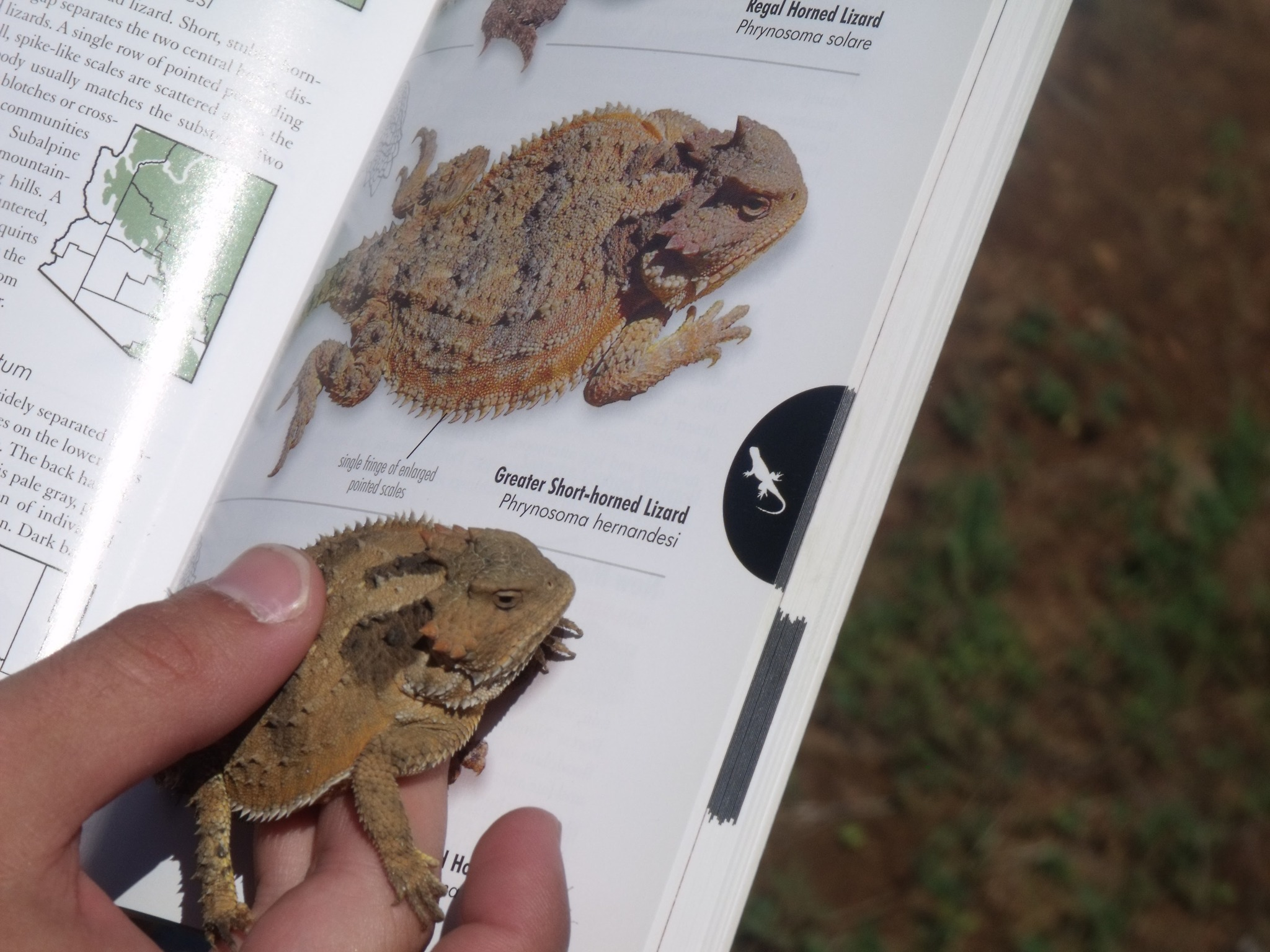
In Arizona

The greater short-horned lizard is often mistaken for its close relative the pygmy short-horned lizard (Phrynosoma douglasii), which has the same basic body type consisting of small pointed scales around the head and back. Until recent mitochondrial DNA evidence, P. hernandesi was considered to be the same species as P. douglasii. They are now considered distinct species with the pygmy short-horned lizard (P. douglasii) occupying the northwest portion of the United States and extreme southern British Columbia. When placed together the two are easily distinguished at full size, the pygmy short-horned lizard being much smaller. P. hernandesi is a highly variable species with different geographic populations exhibiting differences in color, pattern and size with some authorities describing five subspecies.

The greater short-horned lizard ranges in size from 2 to 5 inches (5.1 to 12.7 cm) in snout-to-vent length (SVL) and is a flat-bodied, squat lizard with scales around the top of the head, normally called a "crown". It has a snub-nosed profile and short legs. The trunk is fringed by one row of pointed scales, while the belly scales are smooth. The color is gray, yellowish, or reddish-brown, and there are two rows of large dark spots on the back. When threatened or aggressive, its colors become more intense.

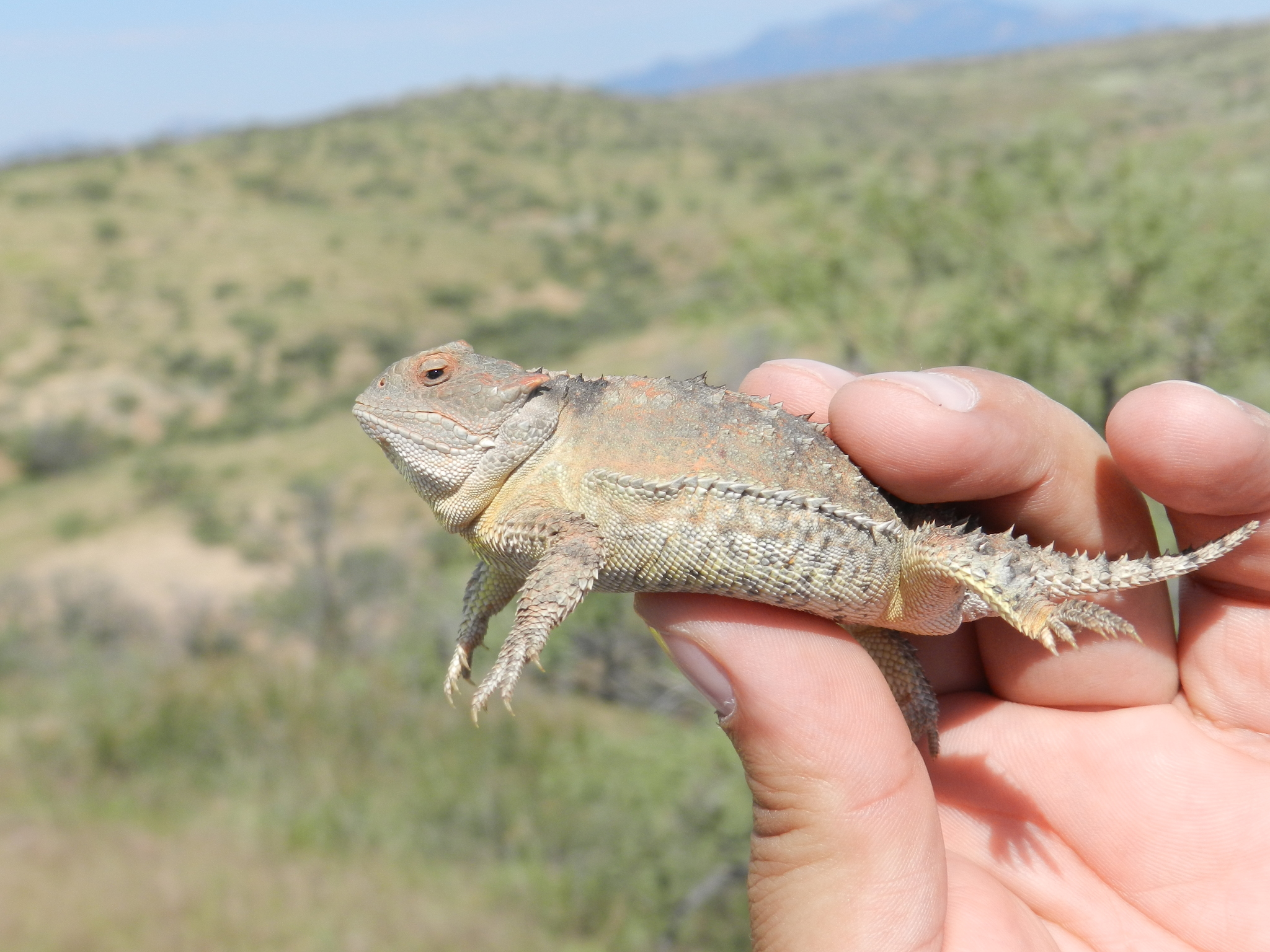
In Sonora, Mexico

Females grow to larger sizes than males: females average about 7 cm (about 2.75 inches) SVL, with a maximum total length (including tail) of about 15 cm (about 6 inches), and weigh about 18 g (0.63 oz); whereas males have an SVL of only about 5 cm (about 2 inches), and weigh on the average about 10 g (0.35 oz). The adult male dermatocranial shape resembles that to be expected of a subadult female of the same body size.

== Behavior ==
The greater short-horned lizard is a "sit-and-wait" predator. It feeds primarily on ants, but also takes an occasional grasshopper or beetle. Often, it can be found sitting in the vicinity of a nest or trails. It is a diurnal creature, being most active during the evening and burrowing at night. It relies extensively on camouflage to avoid predators. Horned lizards have been shown to darken their skin when threatened or to regulate temperature.

=== Defenses ===
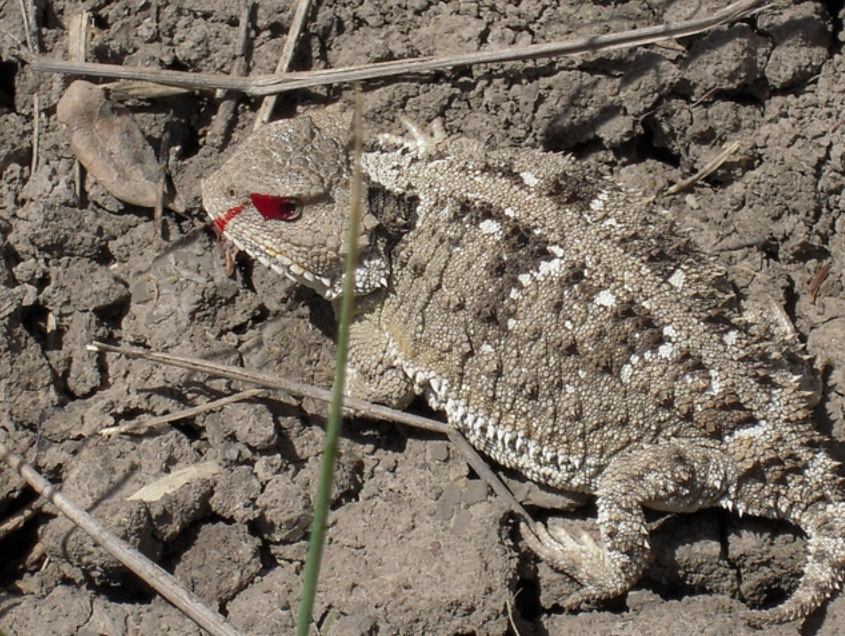
Showing blood from autohaemorrhaging, in Montana

Typically, greater short-horned lizards will remain as still as possible when a predator is nearby, attempting to blend in with the environment. However, if provoked, some species of horned lizards can build up blood pressure in regions behind their eyes and accurately squirt their blood at attacking predators, which will deter canids from continuing their attack. It is rare for horned lizards to squirt blood at humans however, reserving this unique defense primarily for canids (i.e. foxes, coyotes, dogs) and felines, which have a strong reaction of distaste to the blood. Squirting blood has been observed in the greater short-horned lizard, but has not been observed in the pygmy short-horned lizard.

== Reproduction ==
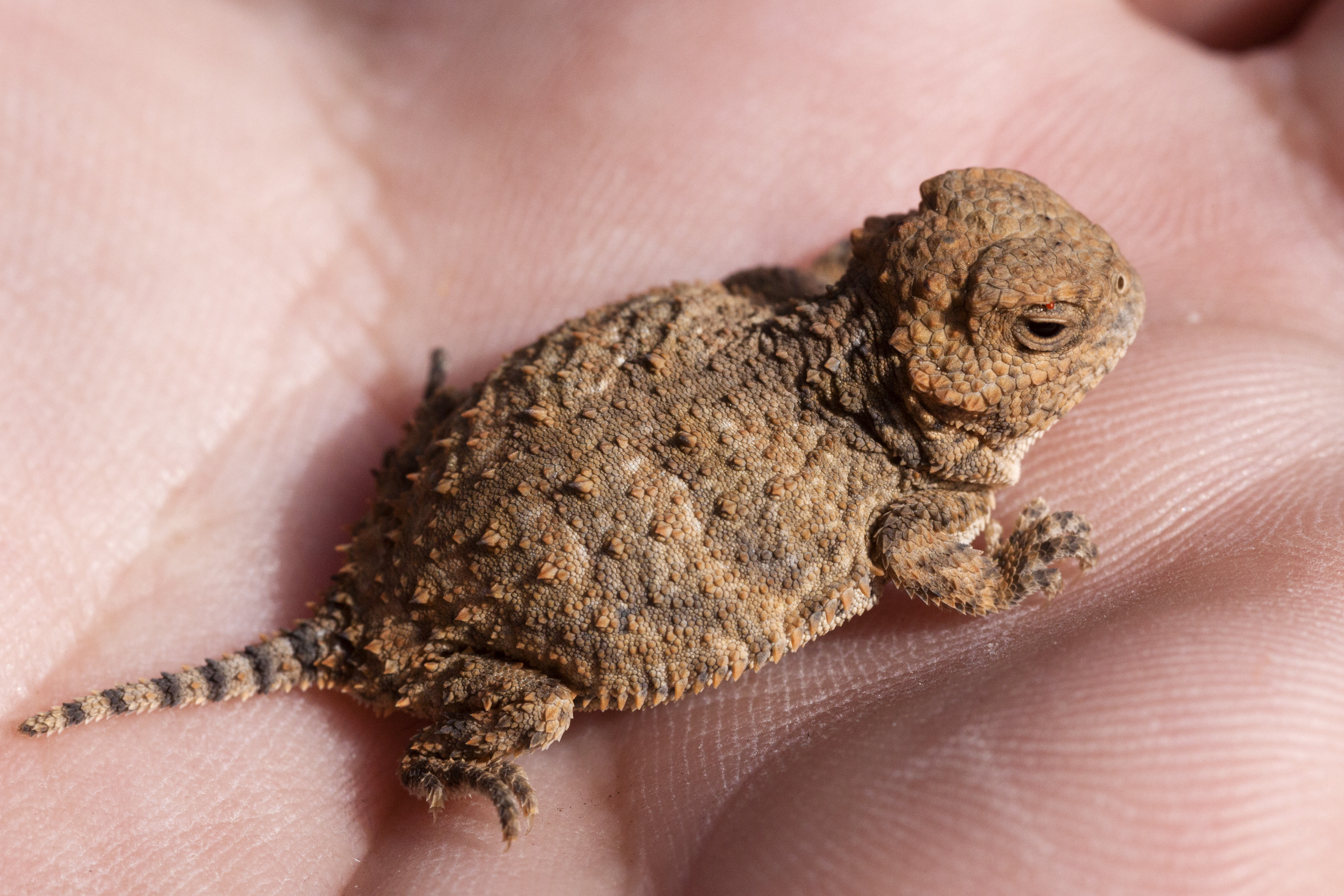
Young juvenile

The mating season for P. hernandesi is in spring (May to June). It is viviparous, giving live birth: the female births five to 48 offspring from July to September. The young measure about 24 mm (0.94 in) SVL and weigh each about 1 g (0.035 oz). The young have no horns yet and are able to take care of themselves within a few hours; they are not able to fully crawl until they are a day old. Males become sexually active after their first year of life, and females generally take two years before they can start reproducing.

== Gallery ==
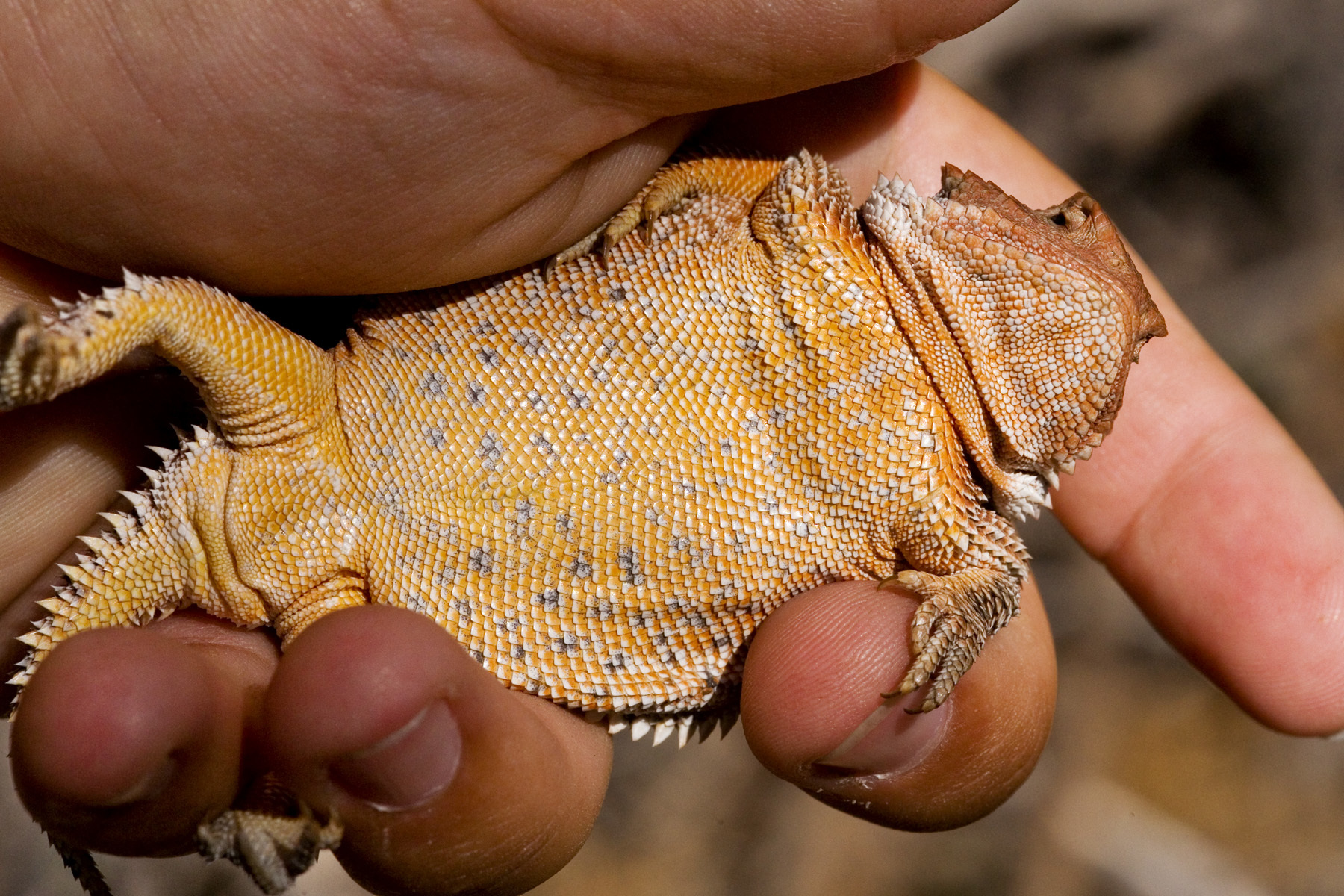
Showing underside, in New Mexico

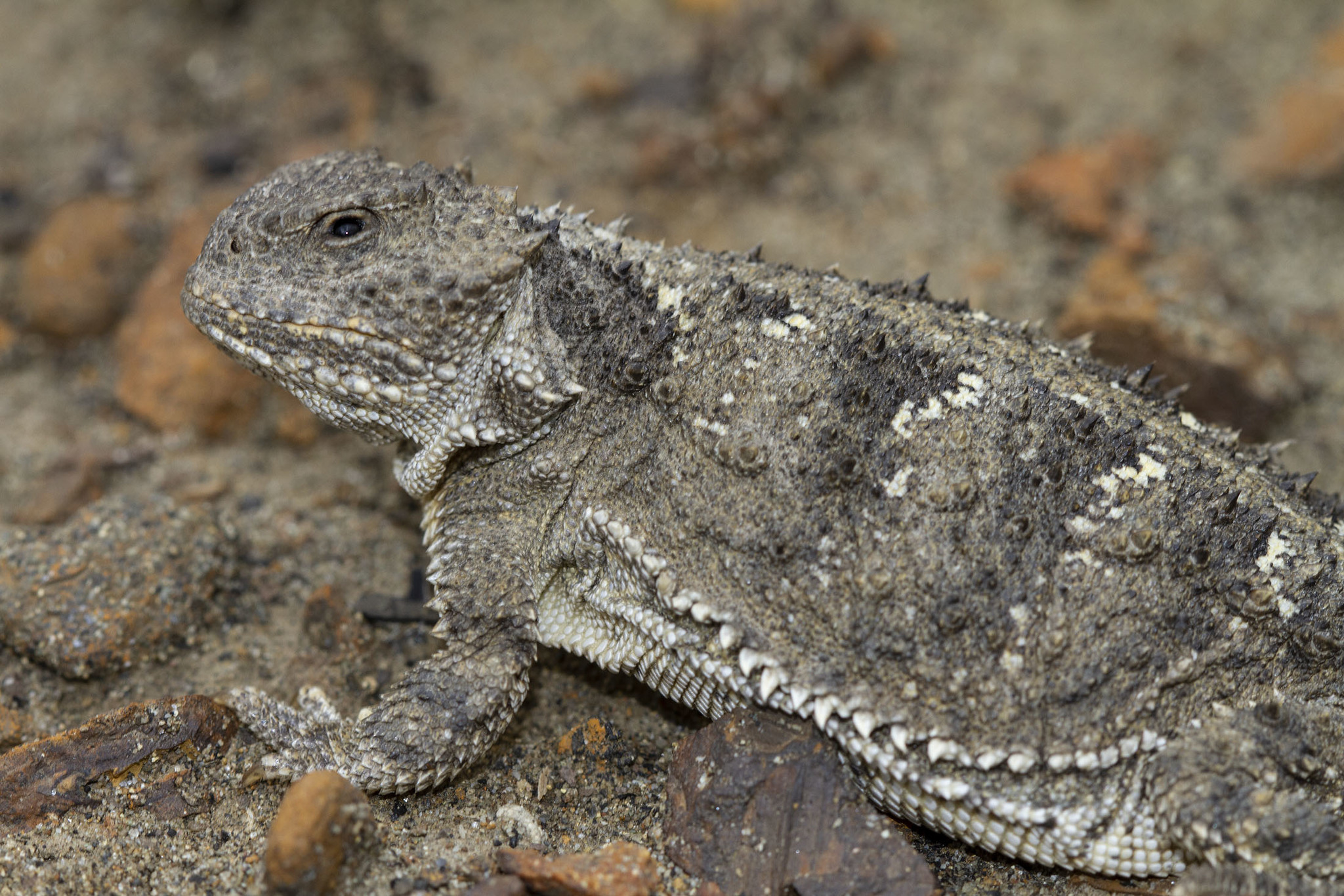
In Montana

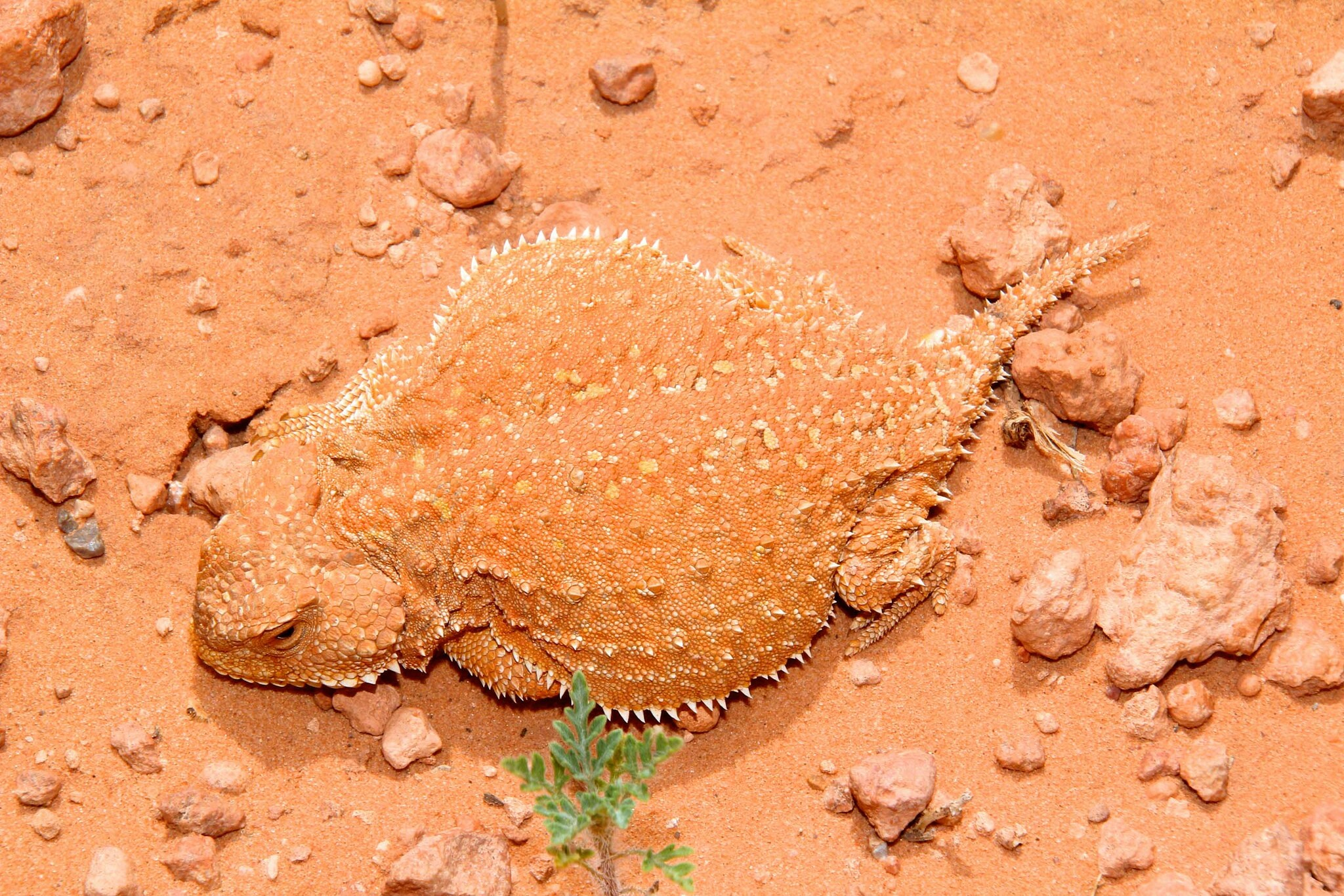
In Utah

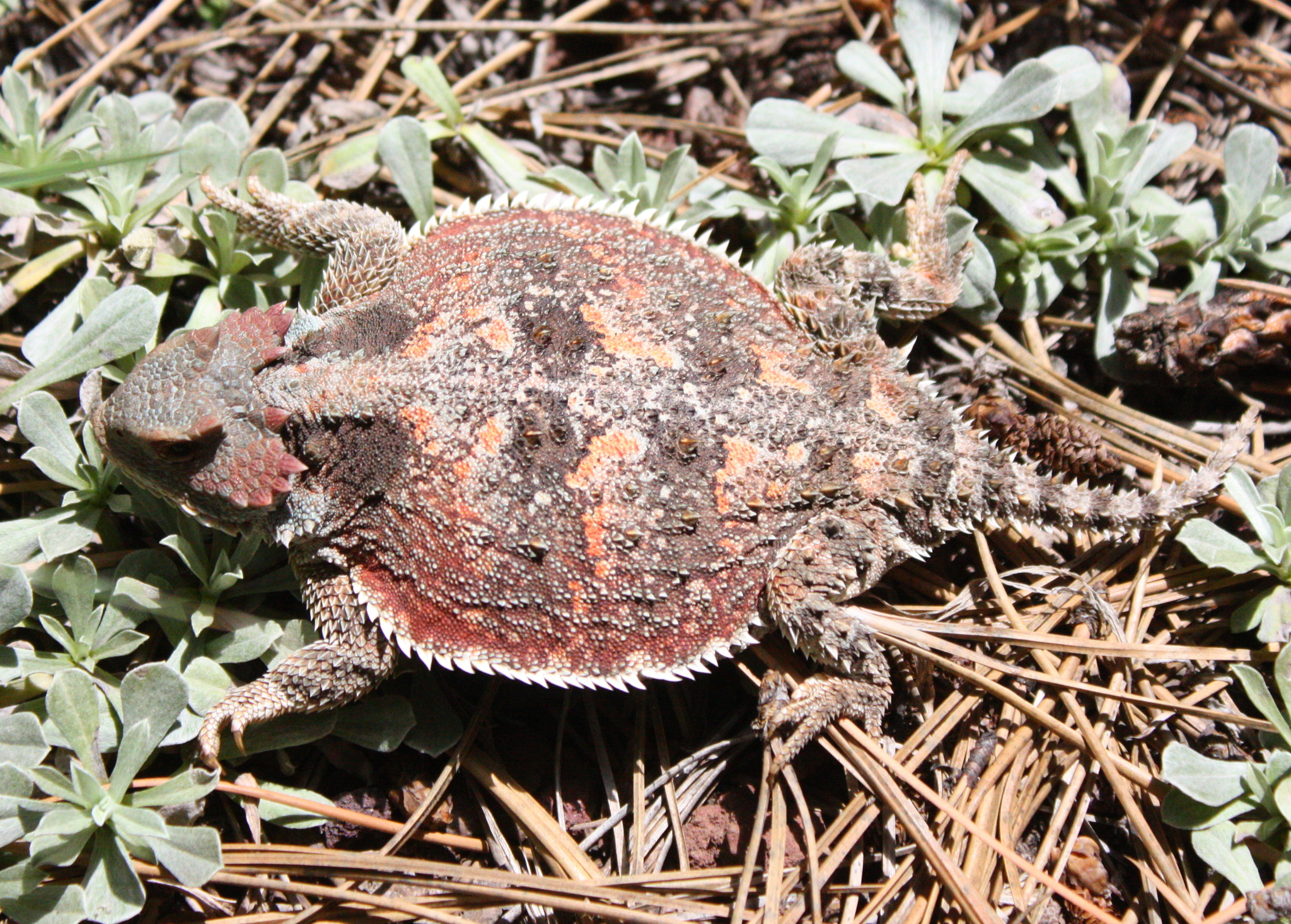
In Arizona

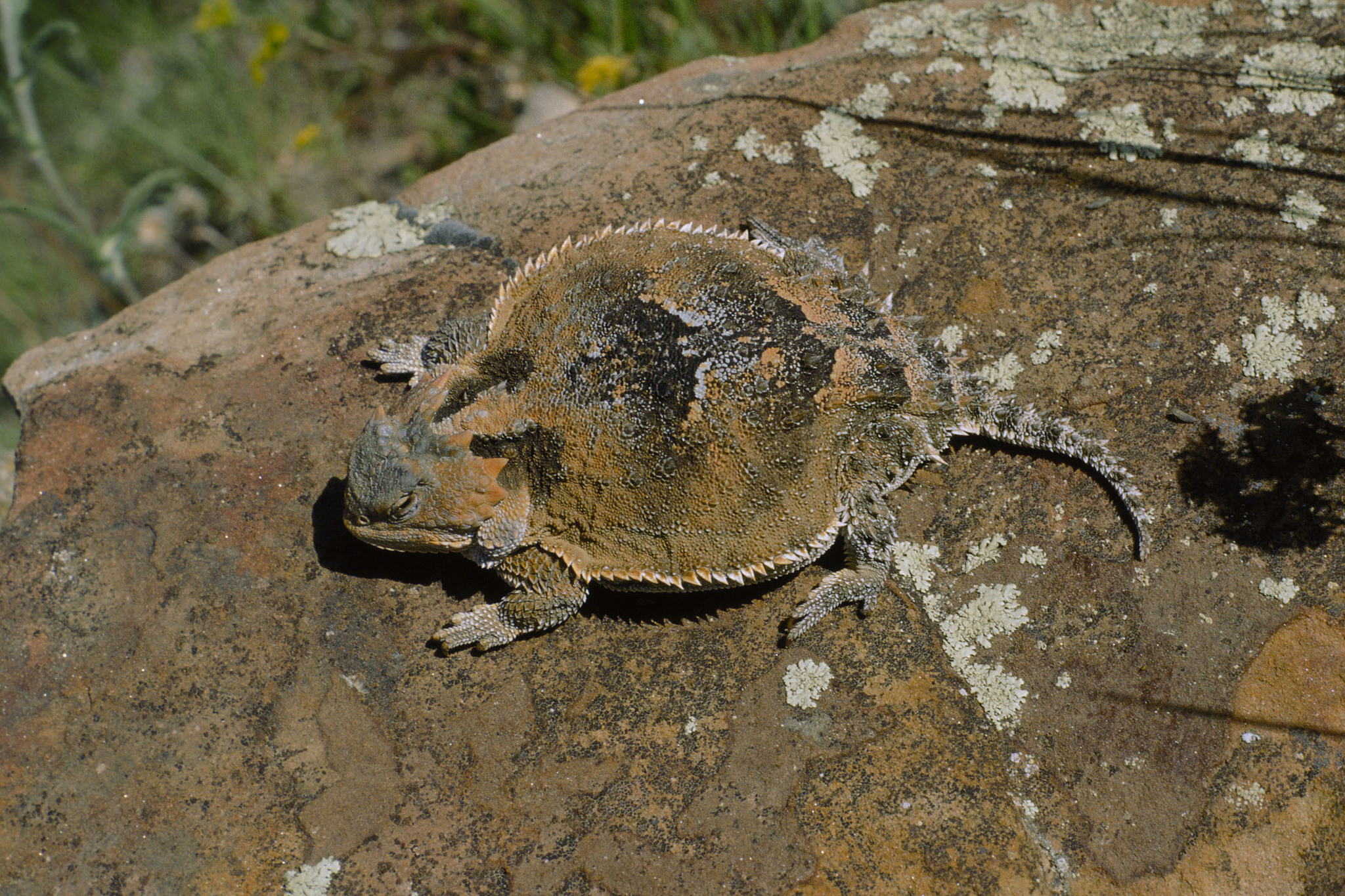
In Arizona

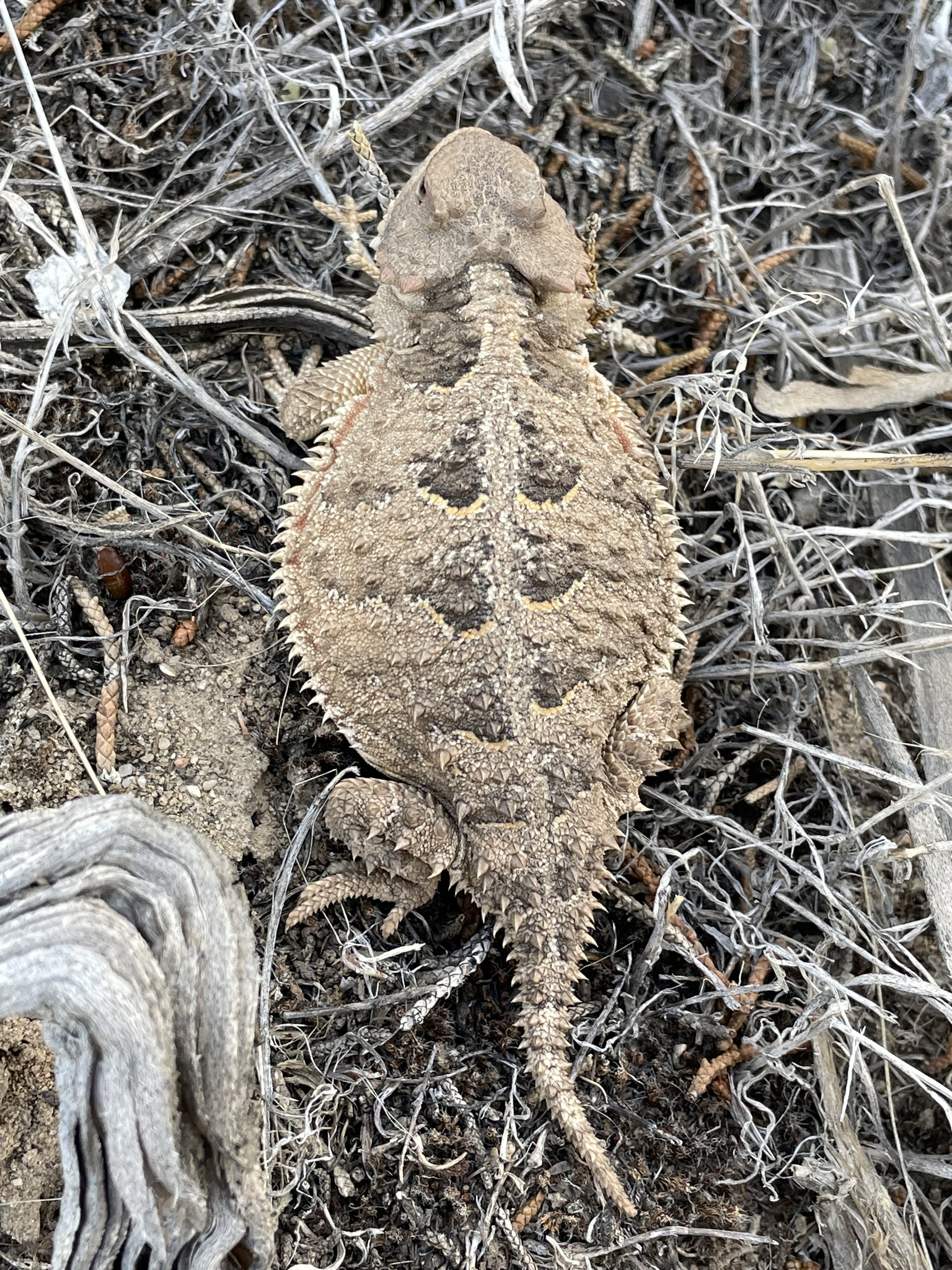

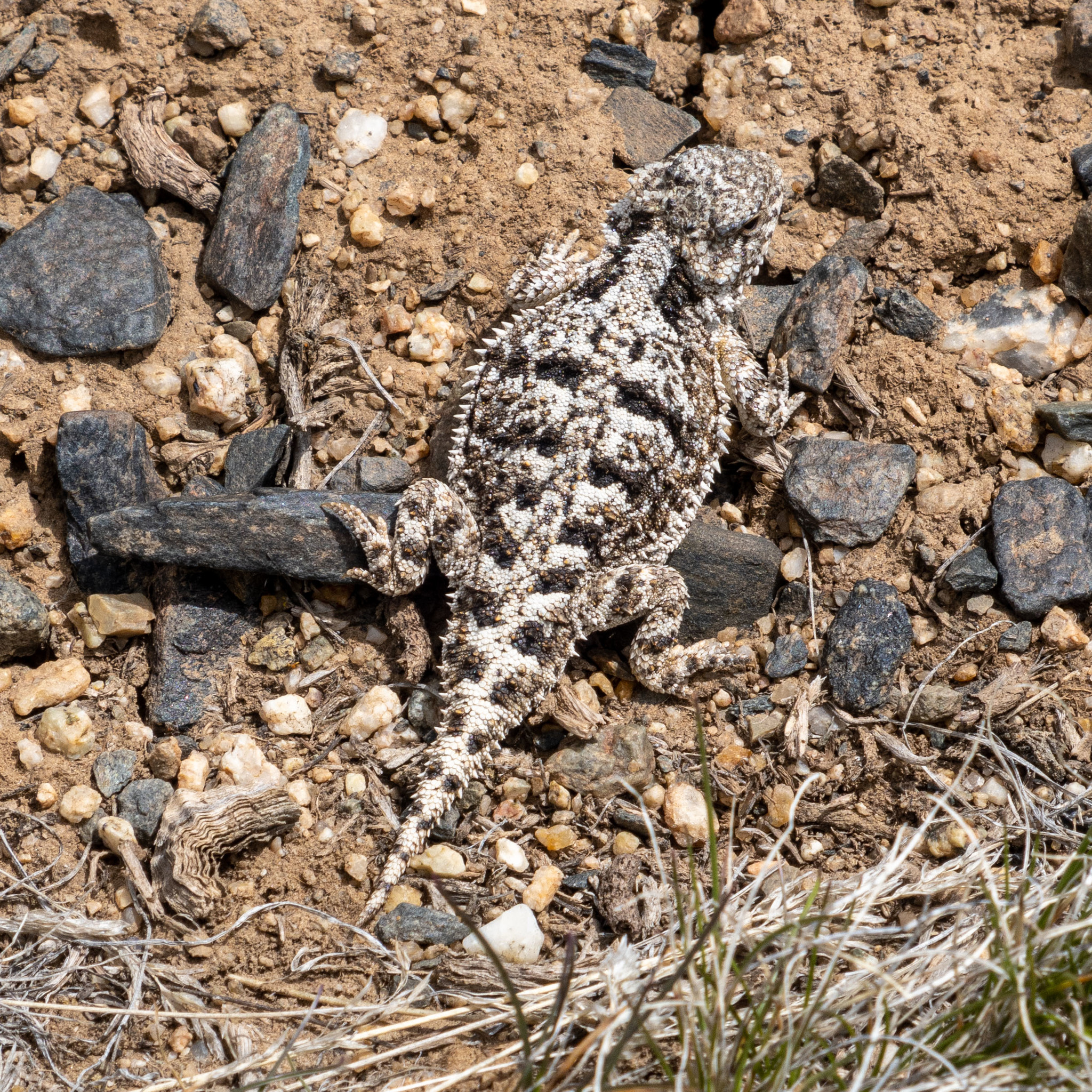
In Wyoming

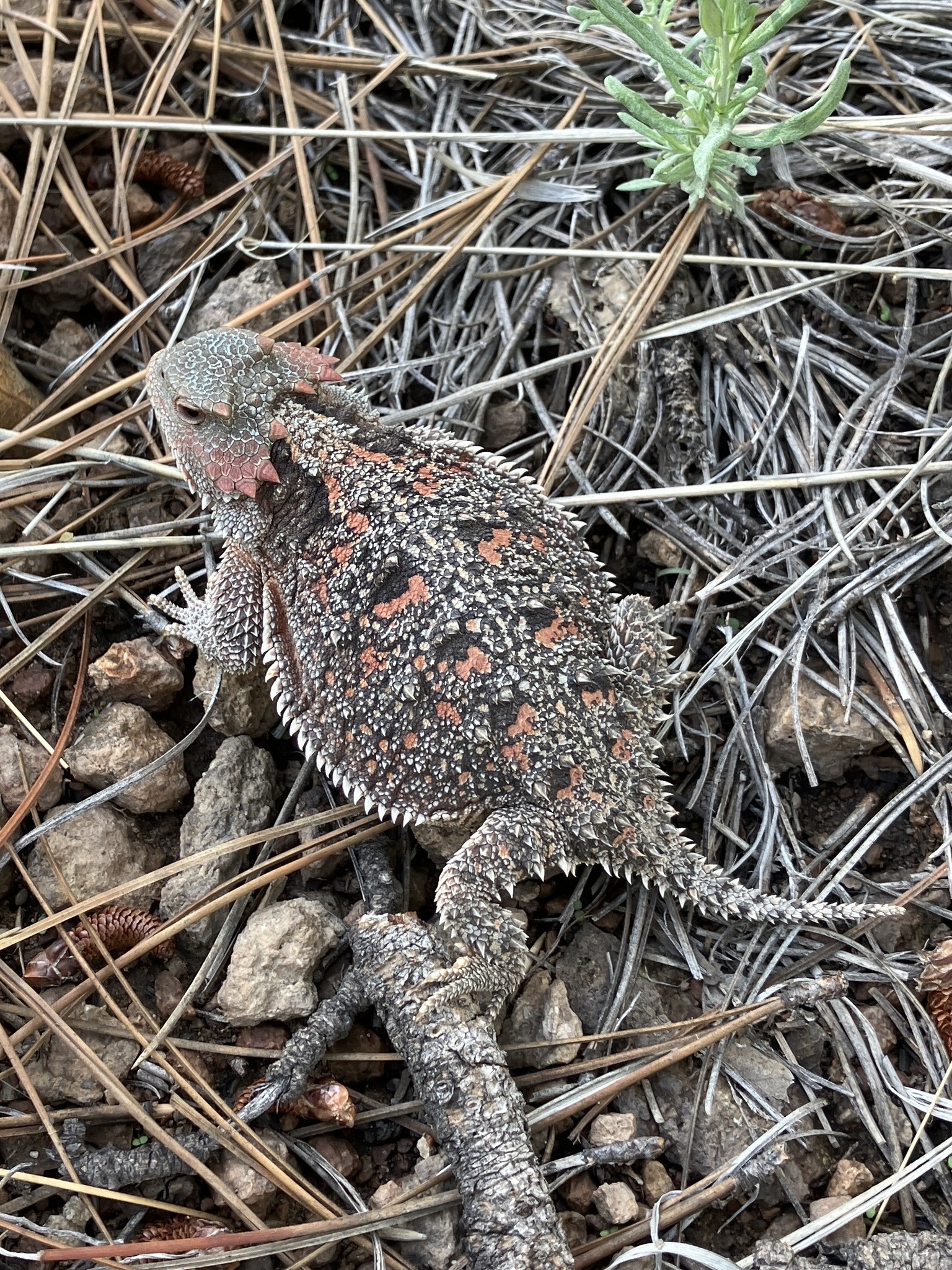
In Arizona

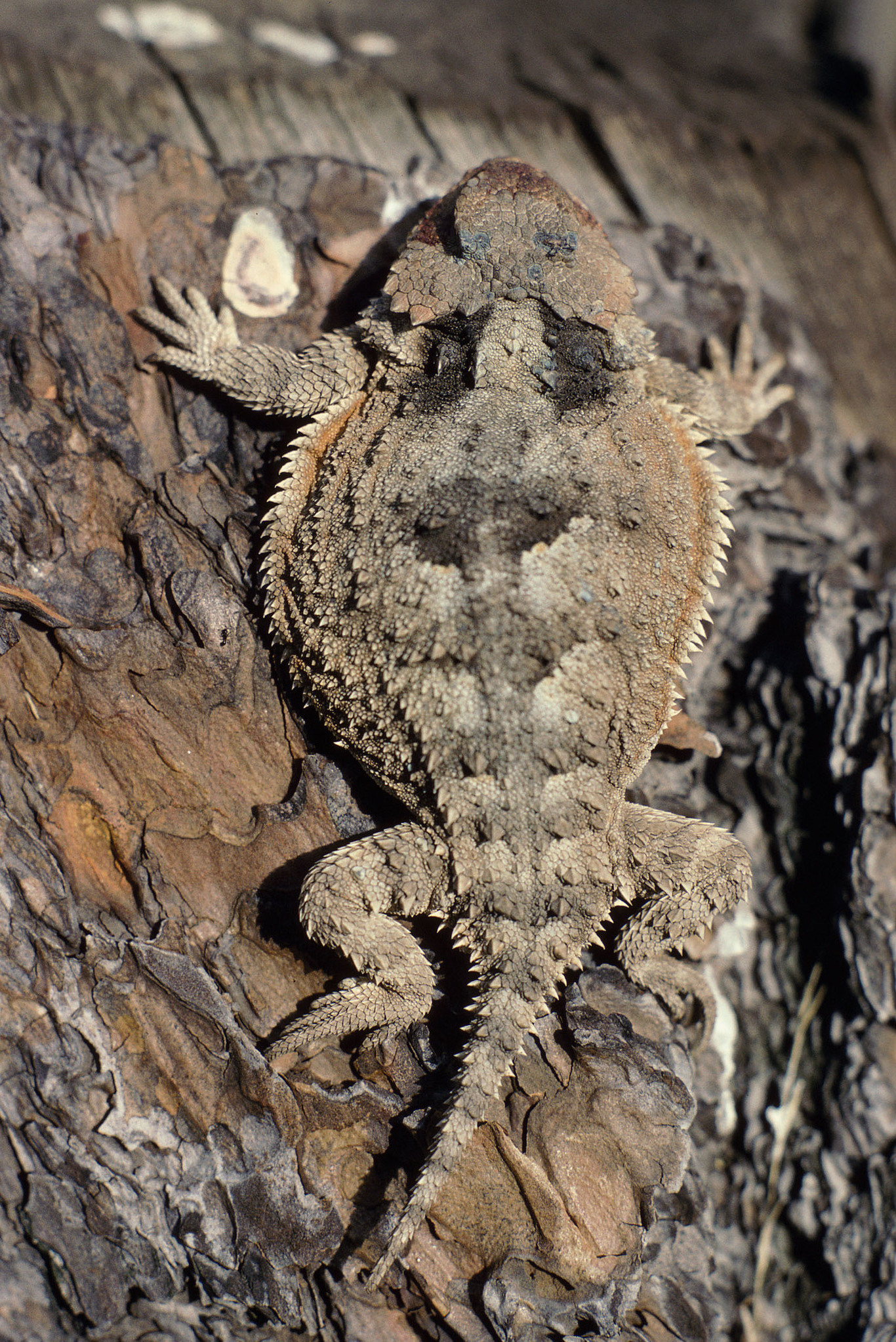
In Arizona

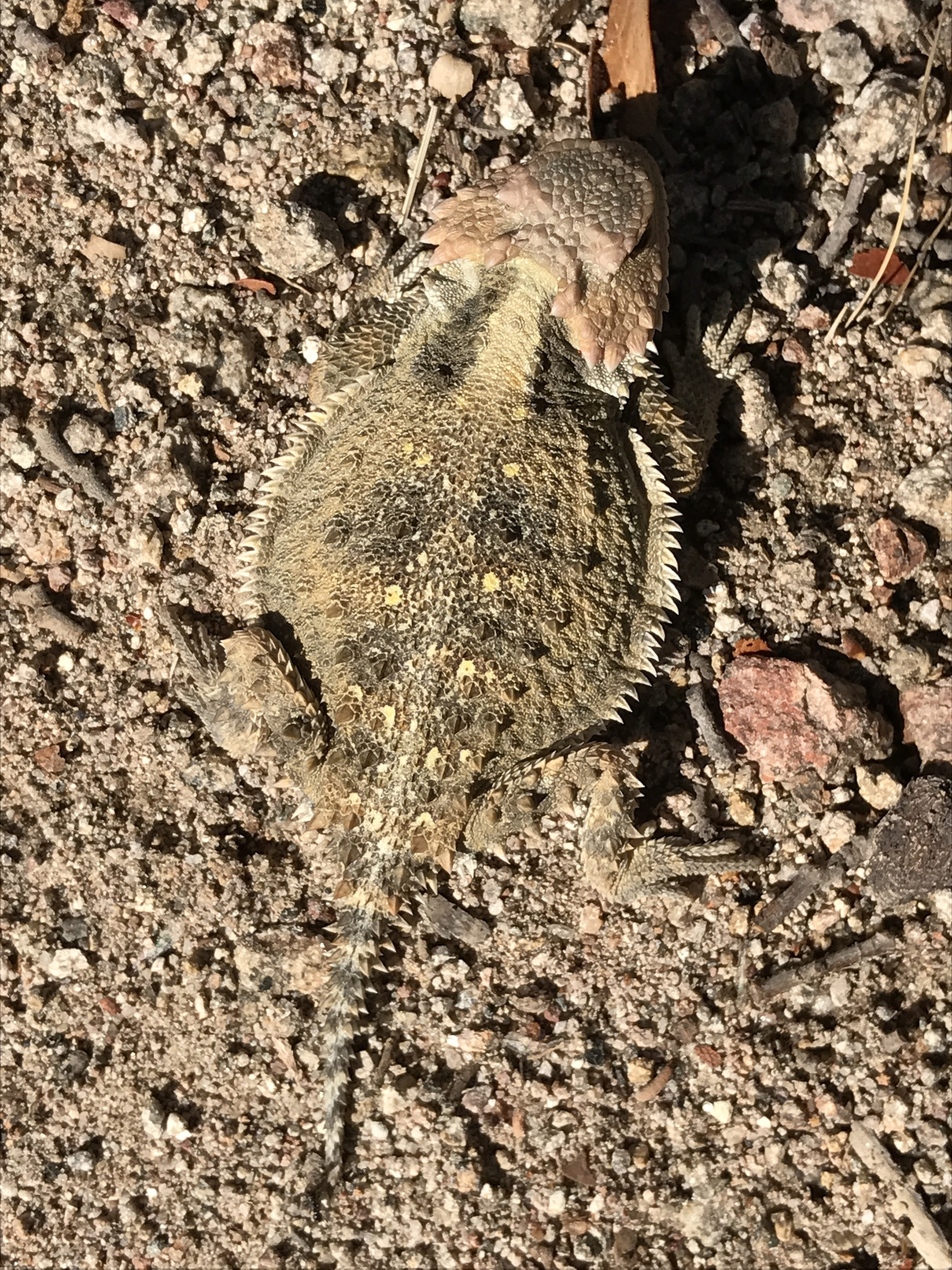
In Arizona

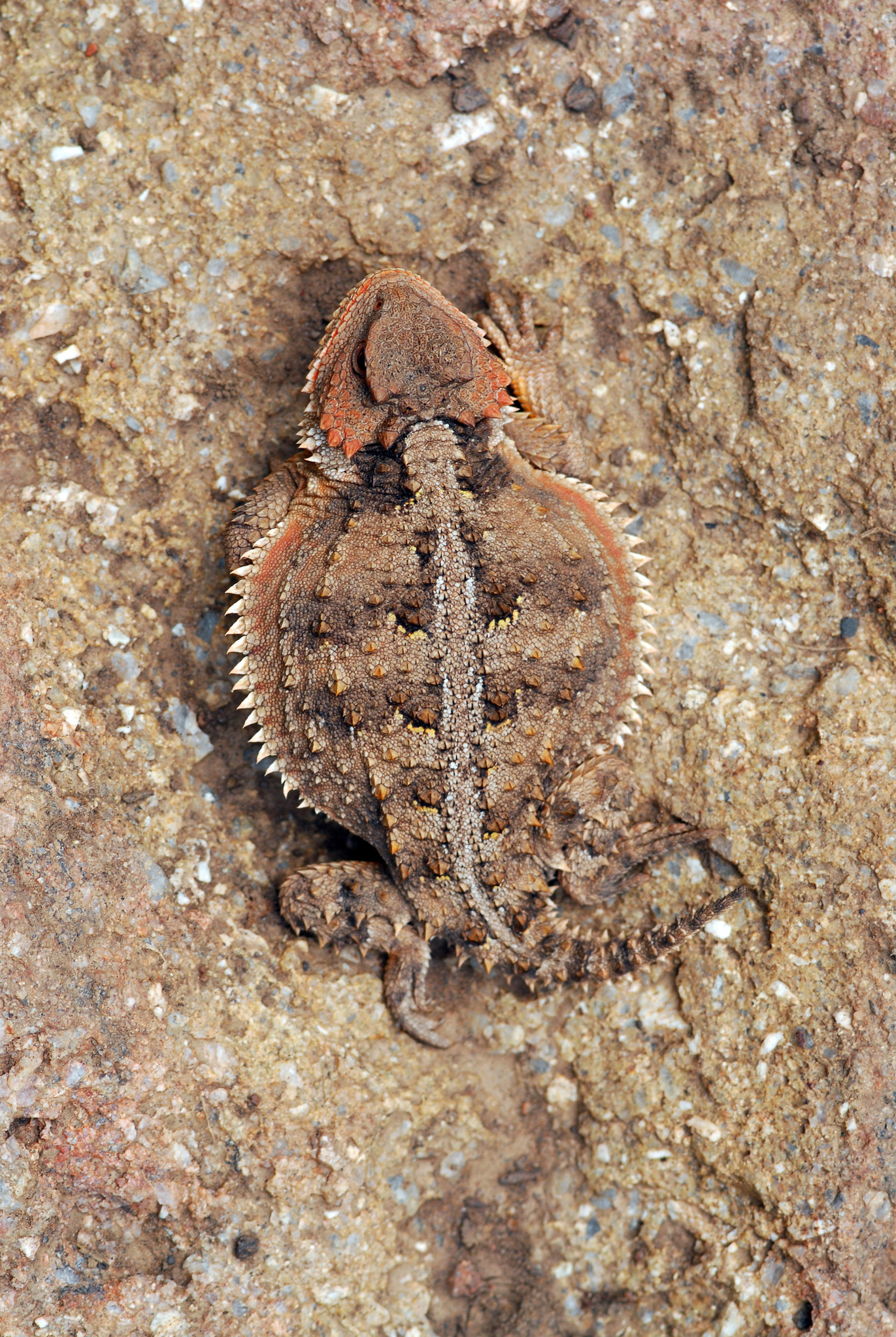
In New Mexico

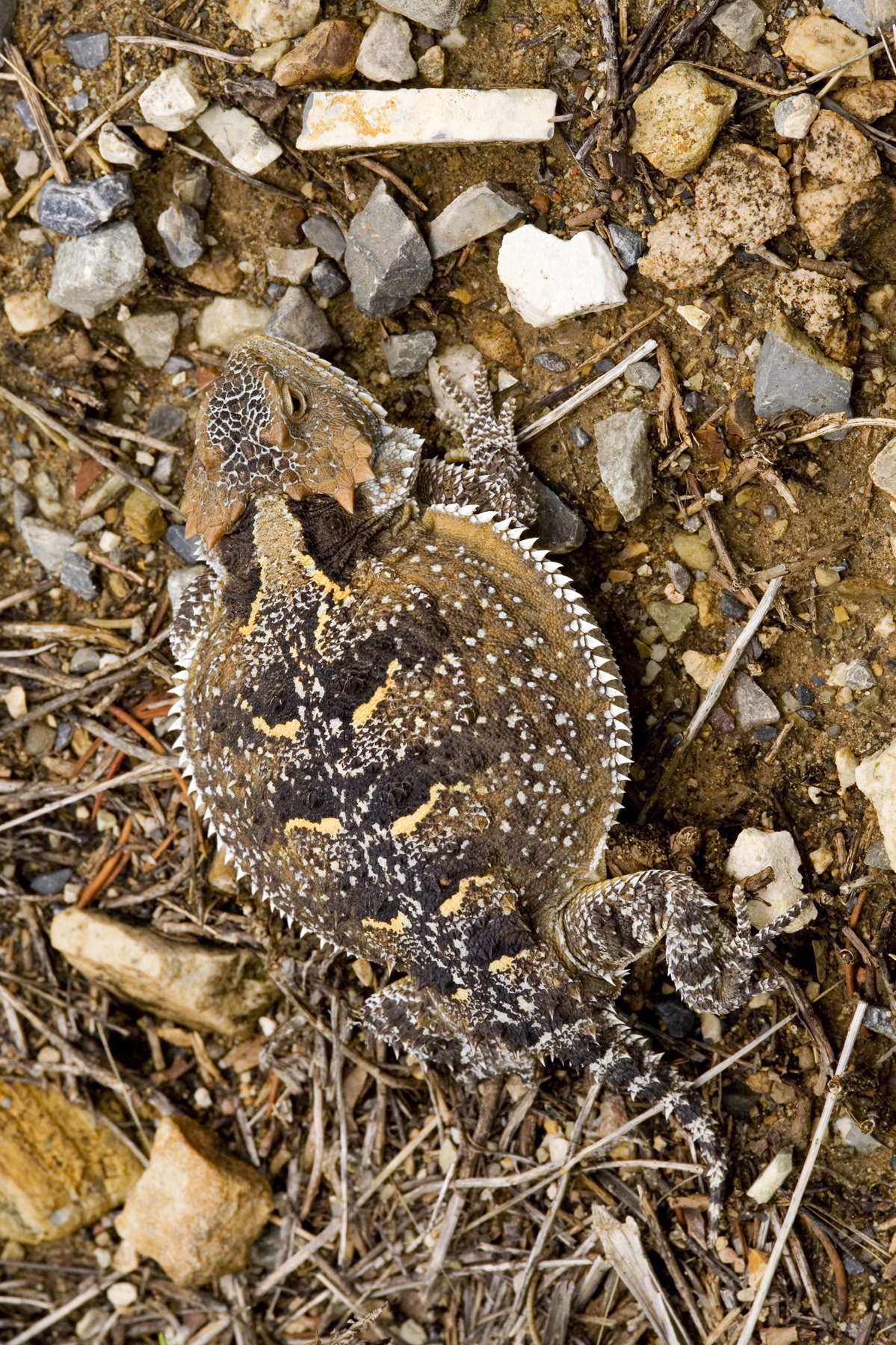
In New Mexico

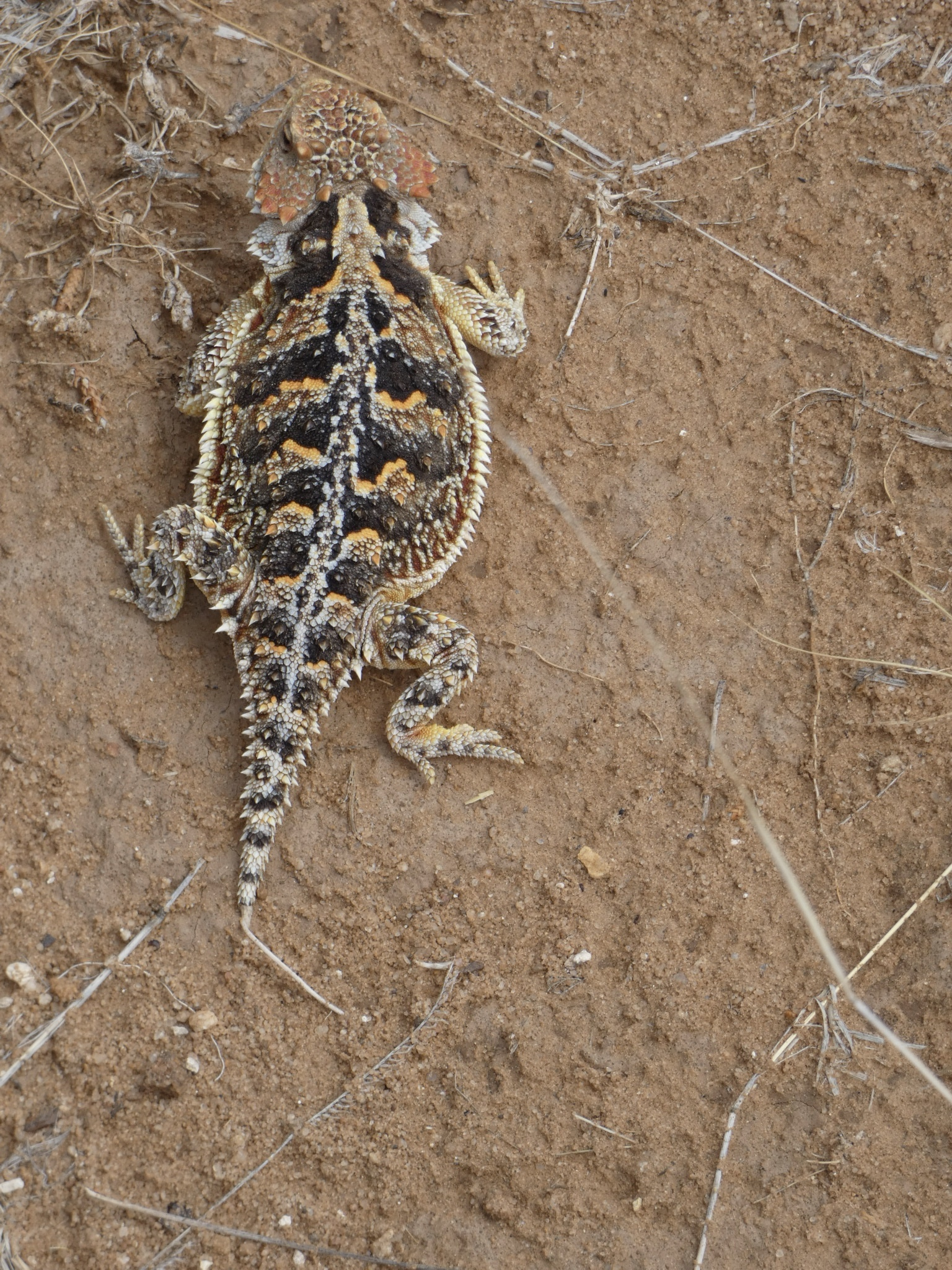
In New Mexico
