= List of reptiles of Canada =

This is a list of the reptiles of Canada. Most species are confined to the southernmost parts of the country. All Canadian reptiles are composed of squamates and testudines.

Conservation status - IUCN Red List of Threatened Species:

EX - Extinct, EW - Extinct in the wild
CR - Critically endangered, EN - Endangered, VU - Vulnerable
NT - Near threatened, LC - Least concern
DD - Data deficient, NE - Not evaluated
(v.2026.1, the data is current as of 2 September 2026)

== Order Squamata ==
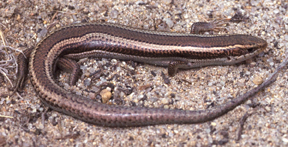
The western skink (Plestiodon skiltonianus skiltonianus) is found in southern British Columbia

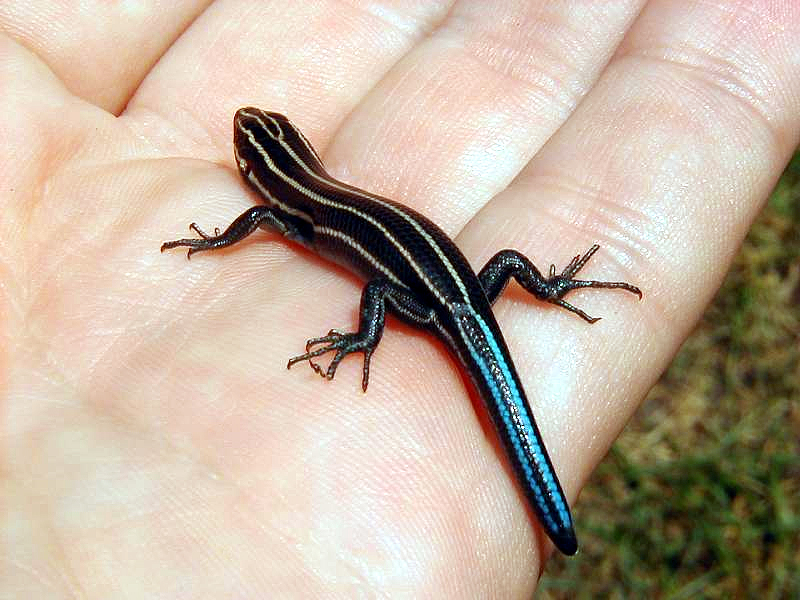
The five-lined skink, Plestiodon fasciatus, finds home in the Great Lakes region of Ontario

Of the order Squamata, lizards and snakes are represented. There are no known amphisbaenids native to Canada.

=== Snakes (suborder Serpentes) ===
Snakes are the best-represented group of reptiles in Canada, with 35 varieties in three families. They can be found in all provinces and territories except Yukon, Nunavut, and Newfoundland and Labrador.

- Charina bottae (rubber boa) LC – southern British Columbia, but not Vancouver Island
- Coluber constrictor foxii (blue racer) LC – Pelee Island in Ontario
- Coluber constrictor flaviventris (eastern yellow-bellied racer) LC – southern Saskatchewan and southeastern Alberta
- Coluber constrictor mormon (western yellow-bellied racer) LC – south-central British Columbia
- Contia tenuis (sharptail snake) LC – southern Vancouver Island in British Columbia
- Crotalus horridus (timber rattlesnake) LC – historically southern Ontario and southern Quebec, extirpated
- Crotalus oreganus oreganus (northern Pacific rattlesnake) LC – south-central British Columbia
- Crotalus viridis viridis (prairie rattlesnake) LC – southern Alberta, southwestern Saskatchewan
- Diadophis punctatus edwardsii (northern ring-necked snake) LC – southeastern Ontario, southern Quebec, most of New Brunswick, and Nova Scotia
- Hypsiglena chlorophaea (desert nightsnake) LC – extreme south-central British Columbia
- Heterodon nasicus nasicus (plains hog-nosed snake) LC – southeastern Alberta southern Saskatchewan and southwestern Manitoba
- Heterodon platirhinos (eastern hog-nosed snake) LC – southwestern Ontario
- Lampropeltis triangulum (eastern milk snake) LC – southern Ontario southern Quebec
- Nerodia sipedon insularum (Lake Erie watersnake) LC – islands in western Lake Erie
- Nerodia sipedon sipedon (northern watersnake) LC – southern and central Ontario, southern Quebec
- Opheodrys vernalis (smooth green snake) LC – southeast Saskatchewan, southern Manitoba, central and southern Ontario, southern Quebec, most of New Brunswick, Nova Scotia, and Prince Edward Island
- Pantherophis gloydi (eastern foxsnake) LC – southwestern Ontario
- Pantherophis alleghaniensis (grey ratsnake) LC – southeastern Ontario
- Pituophis catenifer deserticola (Great Basin gophersnake) LC – south-central British Columbia
- Pituophis catenifer sayi (bullsnake) LC – southern Alberta and southern Saskatchewan
- Regina septemvittata (queen snake) LC – southwestern Ontario
- Sistrurus catenatus (eastern massasauga) LC – Bruce Peninsula and some parts of southwestern Ontario
- Storeria dekayi (Dekay's brownsnake) LC – southern Ontario, southern Quebec
- Storeria occipitomaculata occipitomaculata (northern red-bellied snake) LC - southeastern Saskatchewan, southern Manitoba, southwestern and southeastern Ontario, southern Quebec, most of New Brunswick, Nova Scotia, and Prince Edward Island
- Thamnophis butleri (Butler's gartersnake) LC – southwestern Ontario
- Thamnophis elegans vagrans (wandering gartersnake) LC – most of British Columbia, most of Alberta, southwestern Saskatchewan, and possibly the Liard River Valley in southwestern Northwest Territories
- Thamnophis ordinoides (northwestern gartersnake) LC – southwestern British Columbia, including Vancouver Island
- Thamnophis radix haydeni (plains gartersnake) LC – eastern Alberta, southern Saskatchewan and southwestern Manitoba
- Thamnophis saurita septentrionalis (northern ribbonsnake) LC – southern Ontario and southwestern Nova Scotia
- Thamnophis sirtalis fitchi (valley garter snake) LC – central mainland British Columbia almost up to the Yukon border, and northern Vancouver Island
- Thamnophis sirtalis pallidulus (Maritime garter snake) LC – southern half of Quebec, most of New Brunswick, Nova Scotia, and Prince Edward Island
- Thamnophis sirtalis parietalis (red-sided gartersnake) LC – eastern plains of British Columbia, most of Alberta, extreme southern Northwest Territories around the Fort Smith region, most of Saskatchewan, southern half of Manitoba, and northwestern Ontario
- Thamnophis sirtalis pickeringi (Puget Sound gartersnake) LC – southwest corner of British Columbia, including southern Vancouver Island
- Thamnophis sirtalis sirtalis (eastern gartersnake) LC – most of Ontario and Quebec, and the southeast corner of Manitoba

=== Lizards (suborder Lacertilia) ===
Lizard diversity is low in Canada, with five native species and one introduced species:

- Elgaria coerulea principis (northwestern alligator lizard) LC – southern British Columbia, including most of Vancouver Island
- Plestiodon skiltonianus (western skink) LC - southern interior of British Columbia
- Plestiodon fasciatus (five-lined skink) LC – southern Ontario
- Plestiodon septentrionalis septentrionalis (northern prairie skink) LC – southwestern Manitoba
- Phrynosoma douglasii (pygmy horned lizard) LC – formerly in extreme south-central British Columbia, now extirpated
- Phrynosoma hernandesi (short-horned lizard) LC – extreme southeastern Alberta and southern Saskatchewan
- Podarcis muralis (common wall lizard) - introduced - southeastern Vancouver Island, Denman Island, single records in Vancouver, Summerland and Osoyoos but no populations on BC mainland.

== Order Testudines ==
Of the order Testudines, pond turtles are common in all of Canada's provinces, with the exception of Newfoundland and Labrador, which has sea turtles off its shores as does British Columbia.

=== Land and pond turtles ===
- Actinemys marmorata (Pacific pond turtle) VU extirpated
- Apalone spinifera (spiny softshell turtle) LC
- Chelydra serpentina (common snapping turtle) LC
- Chrysemys picta (painted turtle) LC
- Clemmys guttata (spotted turtle) EN
- Emydoidea blandingii (Blanding's turtle) EN
- Glyptemys insculpta (wood turtle) EN
- Graptemys geographica (northern map turtle) LC
- Sternotherus odoratus (eastern musk turtle) LC
- Terrapene carolina (common box turtle) VU extirpated

=== Sea turtles ===
- Caretta caretta (loggerhead sea turtle) VU
- Chelonia mydas (green sea turtle) LC
- Dermochelys coriacea (leatherback sea turtle) VU
- Lepidochelys kempii (Kemp's ridley sea turtle) CR
- Lepidochelys olivacea (olive ridley sea turtle) VU

== See also ==
- Lists of reptiles by region
- List of reptiles of Quebec
