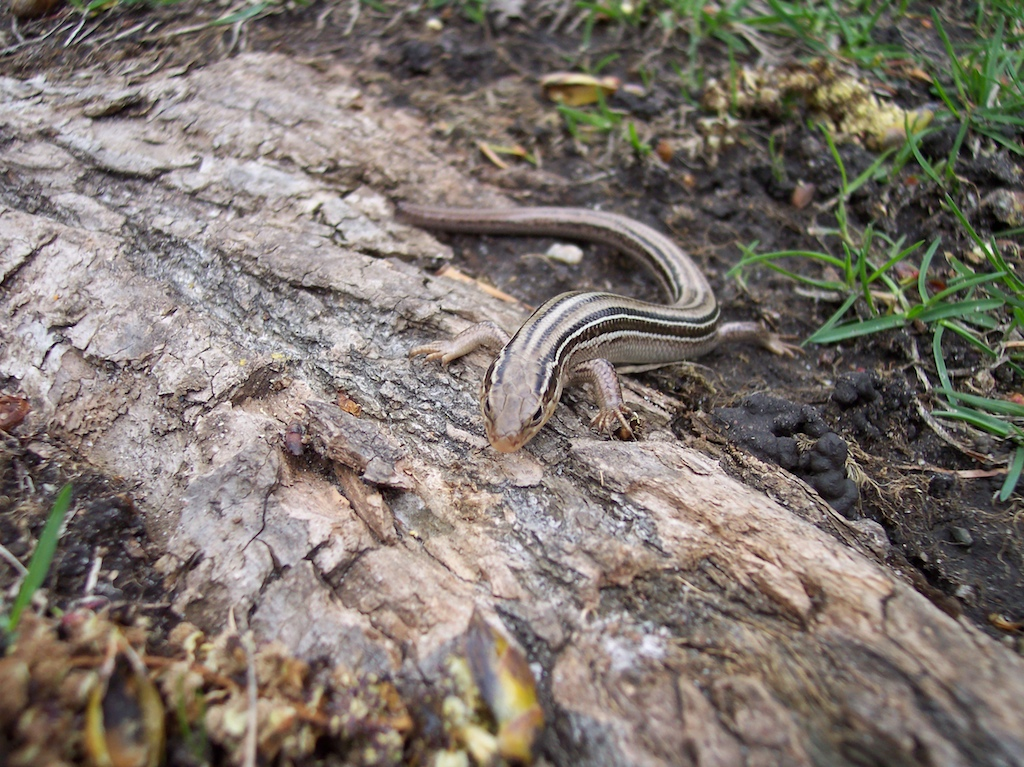

Conservation status
- Least Concern (IUCN 3.1)

Scientific classification
- Kingdom: Animalia
- Phylum: Chordata
- Class: Reptilia
- Order: Squamata
- Family: Scincidae
- Genus: Plestiodon
- Species: P. septentrionalis

Binomial name
- Plestiodon septentrionalis Baird, 1859

Subspecies
- P. s. septentrionalis P. s. obtusirostris
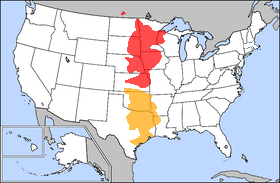
- Northern (red) and southern (gold) prairie skink ranges

Synonyms
- Eumeces septentrionalis

= Prairie skink =

Species of lizard

The prairie skink (Plestiodon septentrionalis) is a species of skink endemic to the prairies east of the Rocky Mountains in North America. It is one of only six species of lizards that occur in Canada.

== Taxonomy ==
The prairie skink was first described by Baird in 1859. Two subspecies are generally recognized, including the nominotypical subspecies:

- Northern prairie skink, P. s. septentrionalis Baird, 1859, originally described as Plestiodon septentrionalis.
- Southern prairie skink, P. s. obtusirostris (Bocourt, 1879), originally described as Eumeces obtusirostris.

A third subspecies was described as Eumeces s. pallidus, the "pallid skink", by H.M. Smith and Slater in 1949, but this subspecies is absent from the literature for the past more than 40 years, and it is unclear whether it exists or coincides with one of the other two subspecies.

The scientific name of the species derives from Latin: septentrionalis means "northern". Latin obtusirostris means "blunt-nosed". Despite the scientific name P. septentrionalis obtusirostris translating to "blunt-nosed northern great skink", it is a southern subspecies.

== Description ==
The prairie skink is a small lizard, reaching a total length (body + tail) of about 13 to 22 cm (5 to nearly 9 inches). Adult prairie skinks are brown or tan on the back and darker on the sides and have several thin lighter stripes along the sides and the back. Juveniles have bright blue tails, the color of which fades when they mature.

== Behavior ==
Prairie skinks are good burrowers; they hibernate in burrows they dig themselves below the frost line. They are very secretive and are rarely seen in the open except during their breeding season in spring.

== Diet ==
They feed on small invertebrates, preferring spiders, crickets, and grasshoppers, but avoiding ants.

== Life cycle ==
Prairie skinks hibernate from about September to late April. In spring, when they emerge, the males start developing a bright orange coloring on the jaws and throat: the breeding season has begun. The female lays eight to ten eggs after a gestation time of about 40 days. The eggs hatch in August; hatchlings are about 5 cm (2.0 in) long. They reach sexual maturity in their third year.

== Habitat ==
The prairie skink lives in sandy habitat or open grasslands with loose soil, preferably with some rocks providing shelter and places to bask in the sun, and close to a water source.

== Geographic range ==
The ranges of the two subspecies are disjunct. The range of the northern subspecies extends from eastern North Dakota and Minnesota south to central Kansas. A small isolated population lives in southwestern Manitoba in Canada—it is the only lizard in Manitoba and is one of only seven lizard species to occur in Canada; the northern prairie skink is protected in Canada. The southern subspecies occurs in Oklahoma and Texas.
