= Entella (river) =

Italian river

- Looking upstream between Chiavari and Lavagna

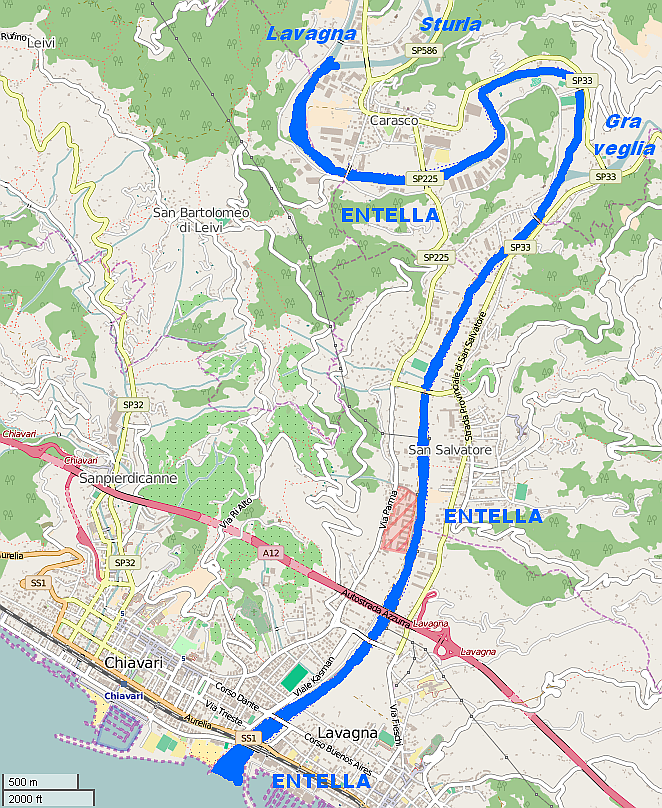

Location
- Country: Italy

Physical characteristics
- Source
  - location: Carasco
  - elevation: 30 m (98 ft)
- Mouth: Ligurian Sea
  - location: between Chiavari and Lavagna
  - coordinates: 44°18′35″N 9°19′54″E
  - elevation: 0 m (0 ft)
- Length: around 6 km (3.7 mi)
- Basin size: 376 km^{2} (145 mi^{2})
- Discharge
  - average: 13.875 m^{3}/s (490.0 cu ft/s)

The Entella is a very short river within the Metropolitan City of Genoa (former Province of Genoa) in the Liguria region of northwestern Italy.

It and its tributaries flow from the Ligurian Apennines Mountains to the Ligurian Sea.

== Etymology ==
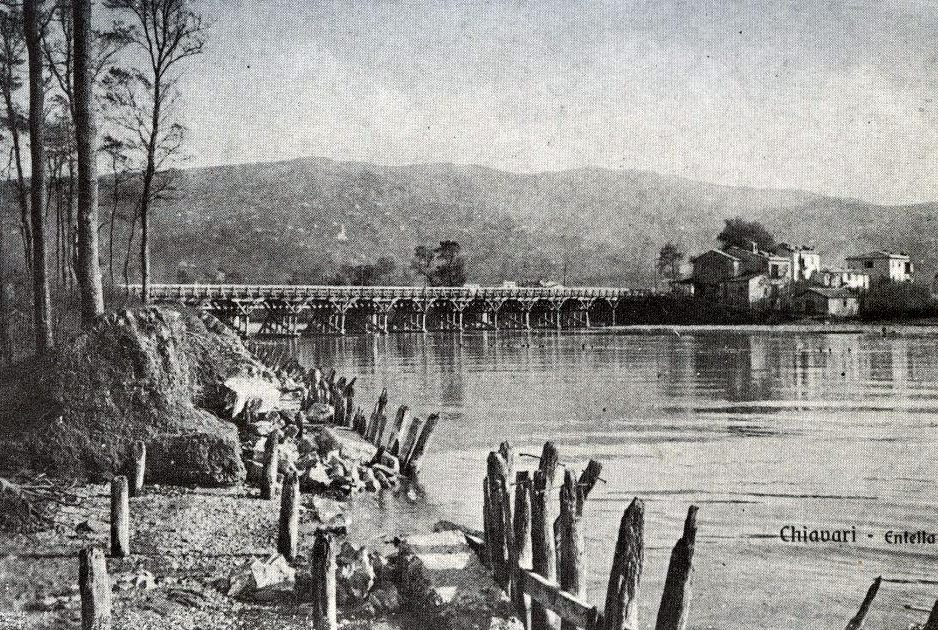
Wooden railway bridge on the Entella at the beginning of the 20th century.

The name Entella was given to the river by Ptolemy; it's maybe derived from entos ( = inside) and elòa ( = olive), due to the dark-green colour of the river banks of its upper basin. The name came into popular use from the end of the 18th century; the river was previously called by common people Lavagna.

In 1914 the football club Foot-Ball Club Entella (now Virtus Entella) took its name from the river.

== Geography ==
The Entella is formed by the confluence of the Lavagna and Sturla streams, near Carasco in the Province of Genova. The river then flows westwards at first before turning south before it meets the Ligurian Sea between Chiavari and Lavagna, in a large and in summer an almost totally dry riverbed.

=== Tributaries ===
Besides Lavagna and Sturla the only relevant tributary of the Entella river is the torrente Graveglia.

== History ==
The Département de l'Entelle or Dipartimento dell'Entella of Ligurian Republic took its name at the end of the 18th century from the river.

== Conservation ==
The medium and low part of the river course belongs to the SIC (Site of Community Importance) called Foce e medio corso del Fiume Entella - code IT1332717.

== See also ==
- Drainage basins of the Ligurian Sea
- Rivers of the Metropolitan City of Genoa
- List of rivers of Italy
