= Attilio Lavagna =

Italian government advisor and court counselor

Professor Attilio Lavagna was born in Cagliari on 13 November 1872 to Carlo and Virginia Thorosano. He lived most of his life in the Italian region of Piedmont. He was appointed advisor of the Italian government under the Giovanni Giolitti government (1920–1921) and counselor in the Italian Supreme Court.

Lavagna is often cited in publications and studies regarding the relations between Italy and China in the interwar period. No author has published a biography about his personal and professional life so far. A testimony of his work is available at the archive of the Italian Ministry of Justice (file 65388). Lavagna served as adviser of Chiang Kai-shek nationalist government with the task of proposing the revision of the new penal code and contributed to drafting the new constitution of China.

== Professional career ==
At the beginning of his professional career, Lavagna studied to become an expert in economic disciplines. He was a student of prof. Cognetti De Martiis, who taught political economics at the University of Turin. Among his available publications, the manuscript 'Il risparmio nelle sue leggi economiche e nella legislazione positiva di Europa ed America'(1895). However, Lavagna preferred the judicial career and in the legal field, he wrote several publications that allowed him to achieve the appointment as an academic lecturer. He traveled in Italy to exercise his role as a magistrate in Bricherasio, Ceva, Orbassano, and finally in Turin in 1909. Shortly after, he became president of the Corte d’Assise (the court has jurisdiction to try all crimes carrying a maximum penalty of 24 years in prison or more) and political advisor of Giovanni Giolitti government (1920). In 1920, Lavagna received the French Légion d'honneur and in 1921 was appointed Grand Officer of the Romanian Crown. During the same year, he returned to the judicial career. He was appointed president of the court of appeal in Turin and in 1926 as a counselor of the supreme court di cassation.

== The mission in China (1933 - 1935) ==
On 30 November 1932, Galeazzo Ciano, at the time head the diplomatic delegation in Shanghai, asked the Italian foreign ministry to propose an expert in the field of law for the government of the Republic of China (telegram 235524 /466 dated 30 November 1932 to Minister of Justice, Diplomatic Archive Italian Foreign Ministry, China, folder 32). In those years, Italian advisers increased the political role of the country in China, while the government was trying to explore opportunities for the Italian industries in new markets. Lavagna was proposed for the task by the first president of the supreme court of cassation. Lavagna traveled to China with his daughter and worked at the reorganization of the ministry of justice as well as at the translation in Chinese of the Italian penal code (Codice Penale Rocco). Lavagna in his papers recalled that it was the only foreign code translated in the Chinese language. Together with the Chinese jurist Tung K’an, the Italian judge lectured a course of ancient Chinese law and Roman law. In a detailed report to the Italian diplomatic delegation in Shanghai dated 23 June 1934, Lavagna stated his accomplishment of presenting the ‘Observations et Propositions sur le Dispositions Generales du Project Revise’ as well as reported the enthusiastic feedback about his lectures at the academy of magistrates.

In the following correspondence to the Italian diplomats, Lavagna lamented his critical health condition, having worked the entire summer in a humid and unhealthy environment. The experience in Nanjing was fatal to the professor. Lavagna suffered from high fevers, dysentery, and ophthalmic infections, but continued lecturing at the university and started his work on the revision of the new Chinese constitution, besides supervising the translation and publication of several political works of Mazzini and Gioberti. As he stated, in one of his regular reports ‘I am glad to continue my work, rewarded by much benevolence and gratitude’.

On 9 October 1935, his mission was accomplished, and returned to Italy. Chiang Kai-shek appointed Lavagna as an honorary legal adviser of the republic. Unfortunately, his health conditions got worse. He gradually was forced to retire from the profession of magistrate and died in Turin on 8 November 1938.
