= Lavagna (river) =

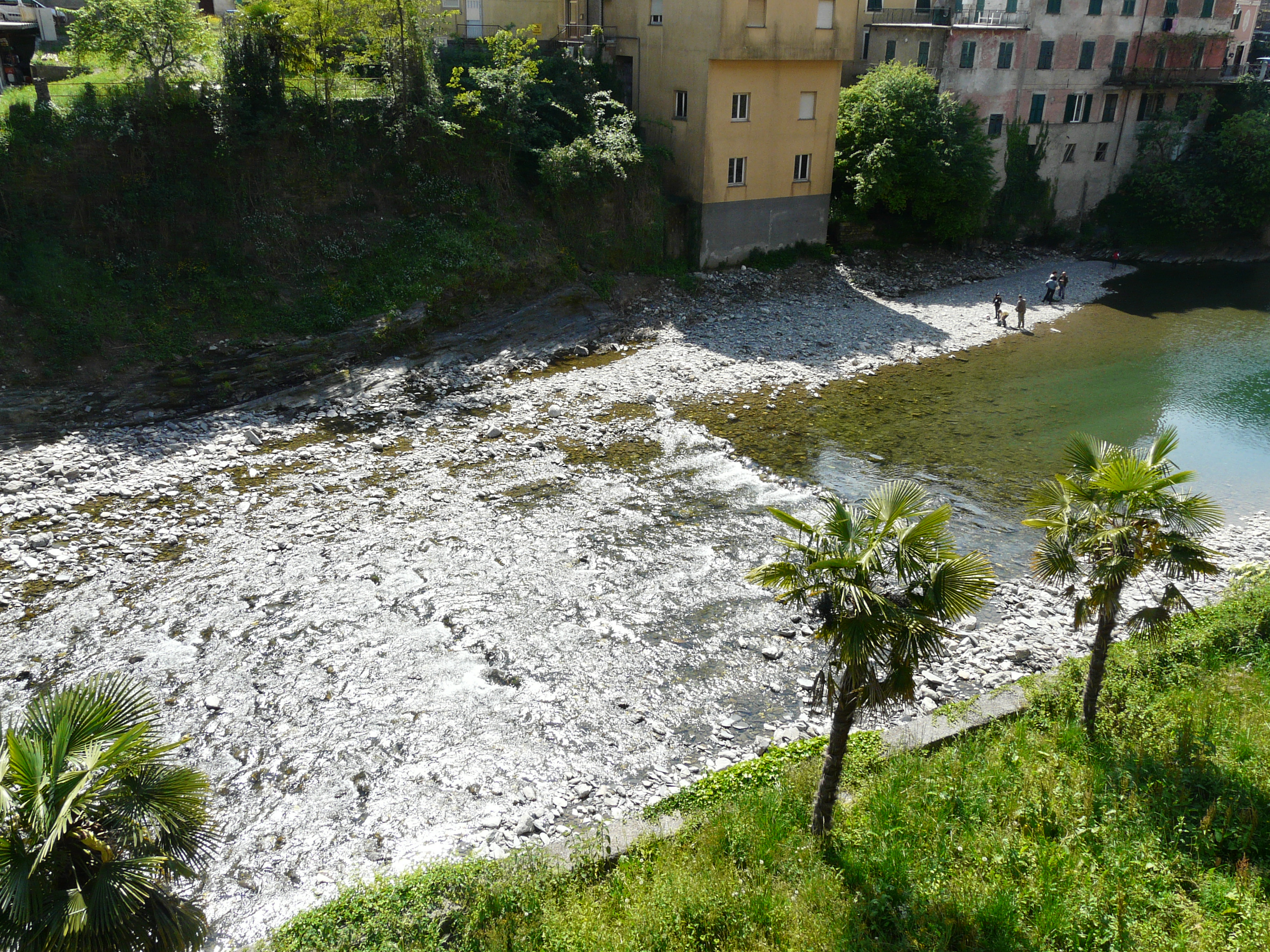
- The river in Cicagna

Location
- Country: Italy

Physical characteristics
- Source
  - location: near Neirone
- Mouth: Entella
  - coordinates: 44.3532°N 9.3402°E
  - elevation: 30 m (98 ft)

Basin features
- Progression: Entella→ Tyrrhenian Sea

The Lavagna is an Italian river in the province of Genoa.

== Geography ==
The source is near Neirone and it flows southeast before joining the Sturla near Carasco thus creating the Entella.

== See also ==
- List of rivers of Italy
