= List of snakes of Wyoming =

This is a list of snakes found in Wyoming, United States. Snake species in Wyoming are primarily managed by the statewide herpetological coordinator of the Wyoming Game and Fish Department.

The Species of Greatest Conservation Need, or SGCN, is a designation from the Wyoming Game and Fish that is "intended to identify species whose conservation status warrants increased management attention, and funding, as well as consideration in conservation, land use, and development planning in Wyoming."

== Snakes ==
| Scientific Name | Common Name(s) | Image | Venomous | SGCN | Notes | Ref. |
|---|---|---|---|---|---|---|
| Pituophis catenifer sayi | Bullsnake | A photograph of a bullsnake | No | No | | |
| Coluber taeniatus taeniatus | Desert Striped Whipsnake | A photograph of a whipsnake | No | Yes | The range in Wyoming is extremely small, only residing near the southern area of Flaming Gorge. | |
| Coluber constrictor flaviventris | Eastern Yellow Bellied Racer | An eastern yellow belled racer with a gray top and yellow belly | No | No | | |
| Pituophis catenifer deserticola | Great Basin Gophersnake | A great basin gophersnake | No | Yes | | |
| Crotalus oreganus concolor | Midget Faded Rattlesnake | A rattlesnake sunbathing beneath 2 rocks | Yes | Yes | | |
| Charina bottae | Northern Rubber Boa | a rubber boa on a blue towel | No | Yes | | |
| Tantilla nigriceps | Plains Black-headed Snake | a plains black-headed snake, with a copper body and a black head | Yes | Yes | While the snakes are venomous, they are considered harmless to humans. | |
| Thamnophis radix | Plains Gartersnake | A black and yellow gartersnake | Yes | Yes | | |
| Heterodon nasicus | Plains Hog-nosed Snake | A light brown hognose snake with brown spotted patterning | No | Yes | | |
| Crotalus viridis | Prairie Rattlesnake | A brown rattlesnake with brown spotted patterning | Yes | Yes | | |
| Storeria occipitomaculata | Red-belled Snake | A reddish brown snake with a black head and a white collar | No | Yes | | |
| Thamnophis sirtalis parietalis | Red-sided Gartersnake | a gartersnake with red and white horizontal striping | Yes | Yes | | |
| Opheodrys vernalis | Smooth Green Snake | A green snake | No | Yes | | |
| Thamnophis sirtalis fitchi | Valley Gartersnake | A gartersnake with horizontal white stripes | Yes | Yes | | |
| Thamnophis elegans vagrans | Wandering Gartersnake | A juvenile gartersnake with brown and light striping | Yes | No | The Wandering Gartersnake is mildly venomous, but the venom is generally negligible to humans. | |
| Lampropeltis gentilis | Western Milksnake | a western milksnake with red, black, and yellow banding | No | Yes | | |

== See also ==
- Amphibians and reptiles of Wyoming
