= List of amphibians and reptiles of Wyoming =

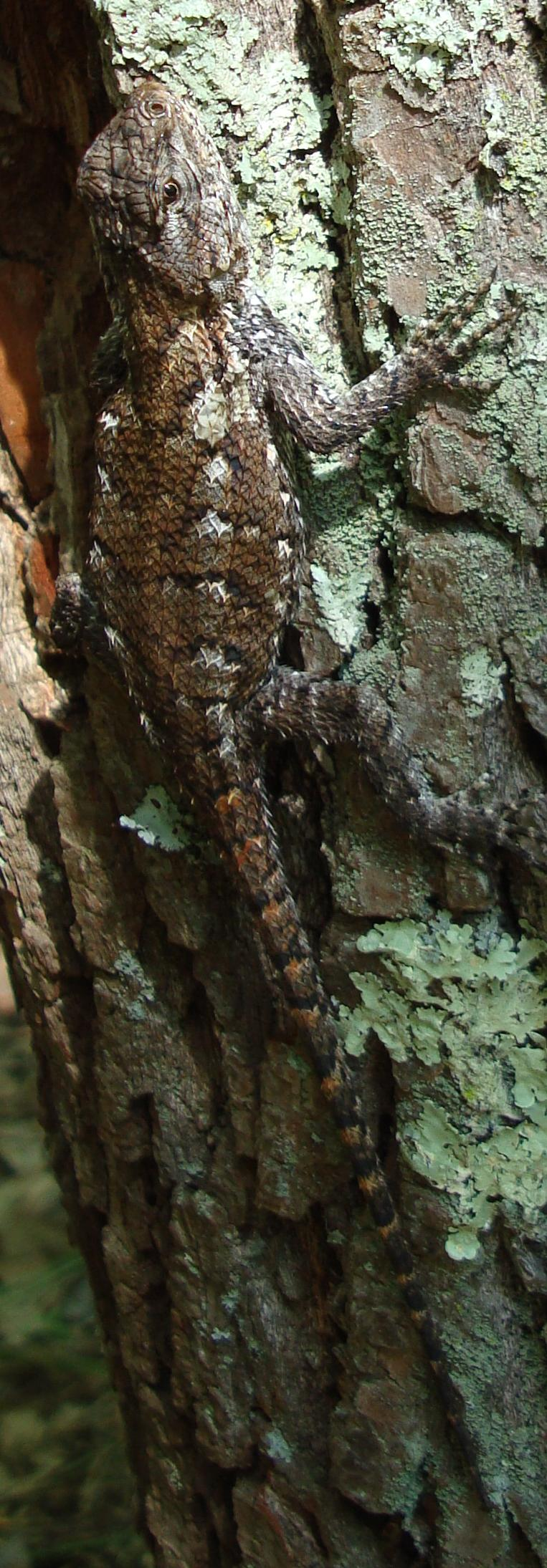
Eastern fence lizard

Wyoming is home to 12 amphibian species and 22 species of reptiles.

== Amphibians ==
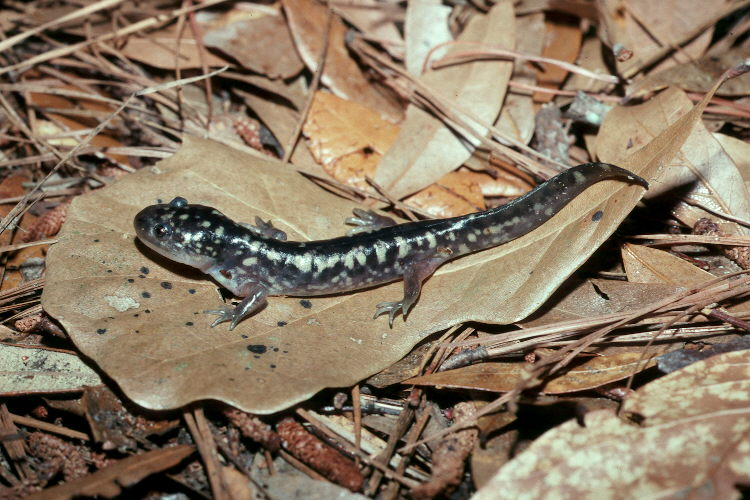
Tiger salamander

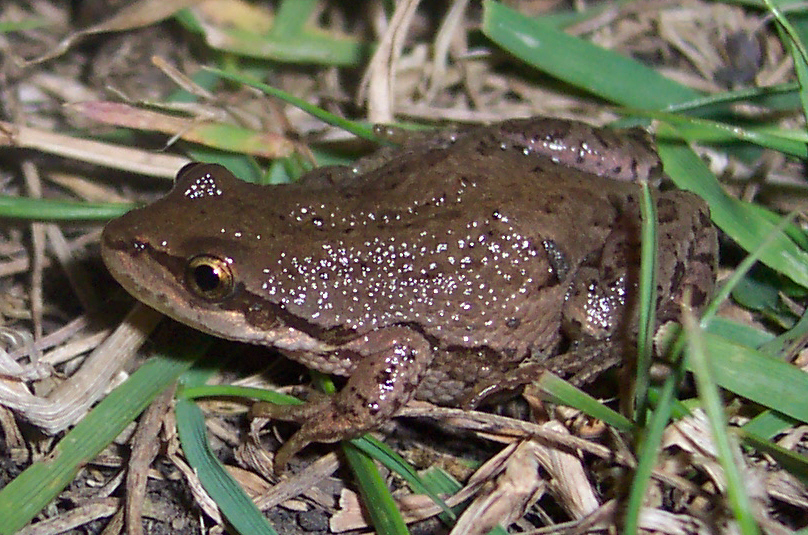
Boreal chorus frog

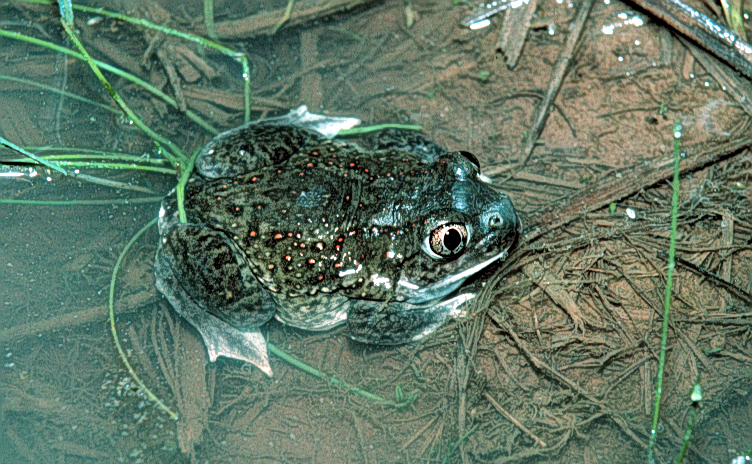
Plains spadefoot toad

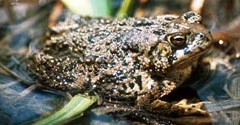
Wyoming toad

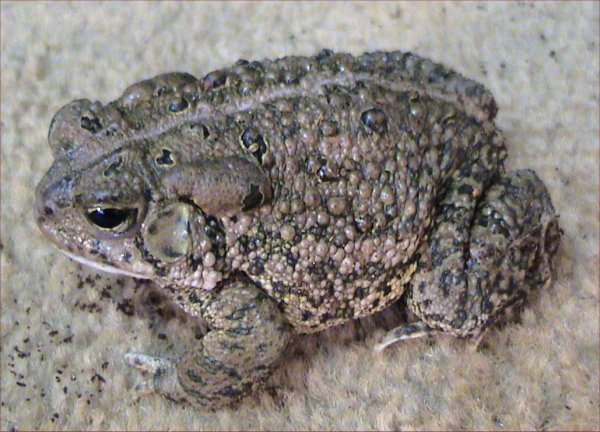
Woodhouse's toad

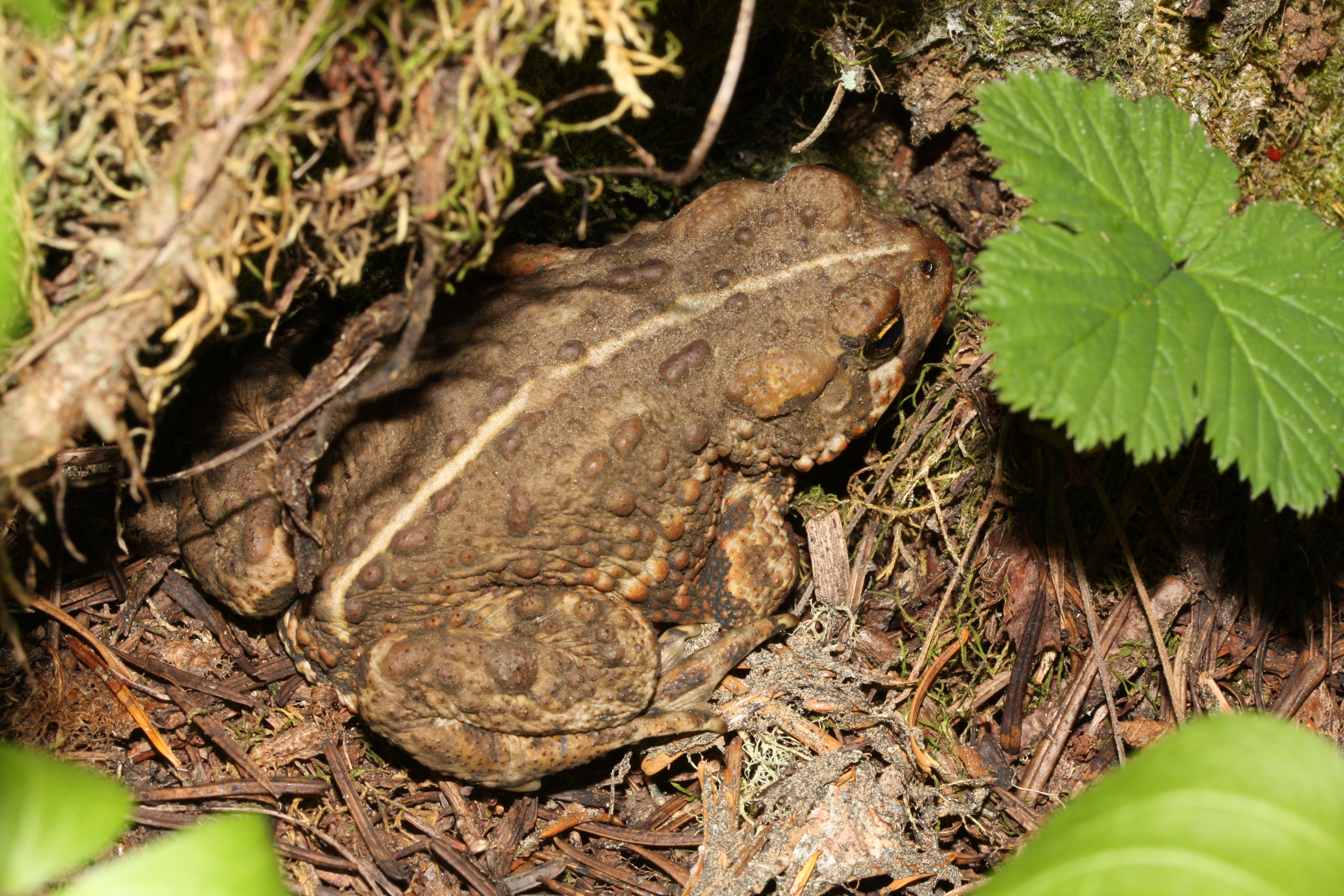
Western toad

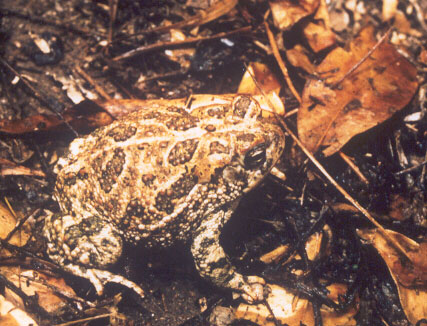
Great Plains toad

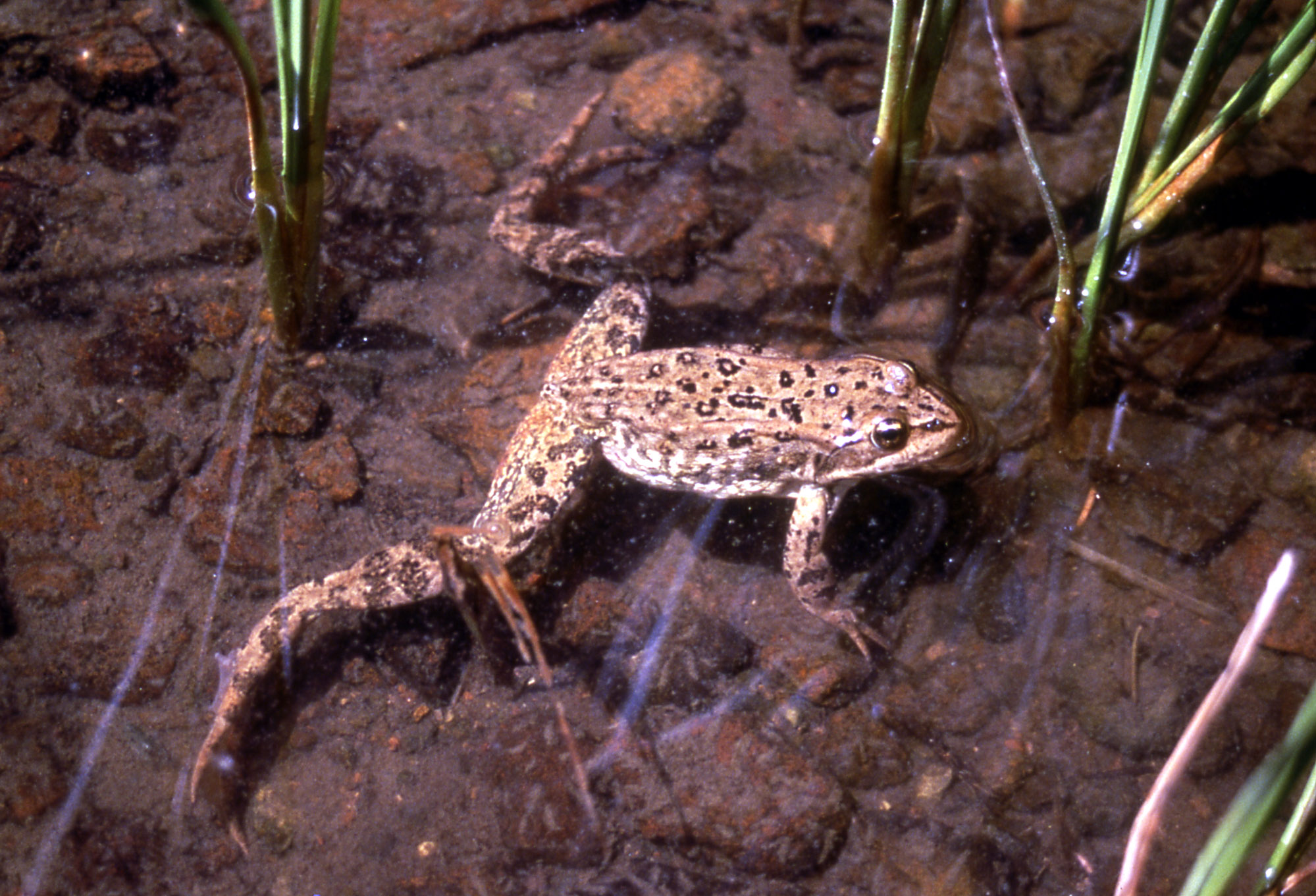
Columbia Spotted frog

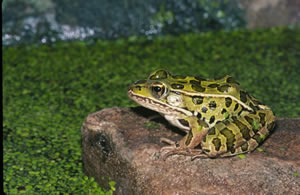
Northern Leopard frog

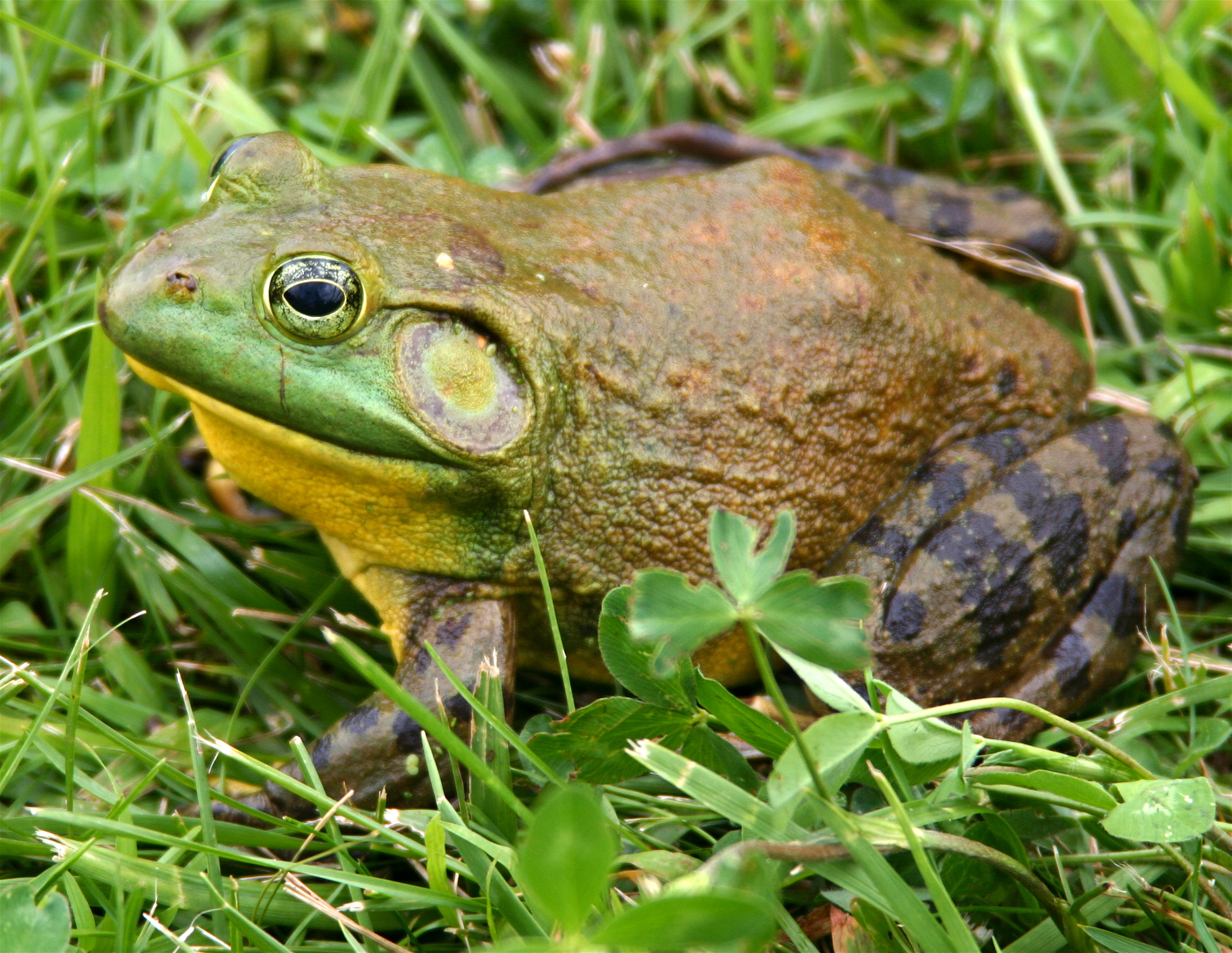
American bullfrog

=== Tiger salamander ===
The tiger salamander (Ambystoma tigrinum) is a species of mole salamander. Tiger salamanders are large, with a typical length of 6–8 inches. They can reach up to 14 inches in length, particularly neotenic individuals. Adults are usually blotchy with grey, green, or black, and have large, lidded eyes. They have short snouts, thick necks, sturdy legs, and long tails. Their diet consists largely of small insects and worms, though it is not rare for an adult to consume small frogs and baby mice.

In Wyoming, the salamander is found in most habitat types with a body of nonflowing water nearby for breeding.

=== Boreal chorus frog ===
The boreal chorus frog, (Pseudacris maculata) is a species of chorus frog native to Canada from the west of Lake Superior to western Alberta and north to the North West Territories. It occurs in the USA throughout Montana, northwestern Wisconsin, northeastern Arizona, northern New Mexico and southwestern Utah. This is a small species of frog, reaching about 30mm in length. It is highly variable however it is normally brown, but can be green on the dorsal surface, with 3 broken dorsal stripes, these stripes can be very distinct to quite faint. There is a dark band present from the snout, through the eye and continuing down the side. It has slightly enlarged toes discs to help in climbing small grasses and vegetation.

In Wyoming, this frog is found in marshes, ponds, small lakes, up to 12,000 feet (3,700 m).

=== Great Basin spadefoot toad ===
The Great Basin spadefoot (Spea intermontana) is a species of toad in the family Scaphiopodidae. The natural habitats of the Great Basin spadefoot include pinyon-juniper, ponderosa pine, and high elevation spruce-fir forests, semidesert shrubland, sagebrush flats, temperate grasslands, and deserts. They are present in agricultural areas as well. The Great Basin spadefoot can be found from southern British Columbia through the eastern portions of Washington and Oregon and in southern Idaho. Their range extends throughout all of Nevada and into most of Utah; they are also present in small areas in California, Arizona, Colorado, and Wyoming.

In Wyoming, this toad is found in sagebrush communities below 6,000 feet (1,800 m), west of the Continental Divide.

=== Plains spadefoot toad ===
The plains spadefoot toad (Spea bombifrons) is a species of spadefoot toad which ranges from southwestern Canada, throughout the Great Plains of the western United States, and into northern Mexico. Like other species of spadefoot toad, they get their name from a spade-like projection on their hind legs which allows them to dig into sandy soils. The Plains spadefoot toad generally grows from 1.5 to 2.5 inches in length, has a round body, with relatively short legs. They vary in color from greys to browns, usually reflecting the color of the soil in their native habitat, with a white underside. Sometimes they have light striping on their back.

In Wyoming, this toad is found in grasslands and sagebrush communities below 6,000 feet (1,800 m) east of the Continental Divide.

=== Western toad ===
The western toad or boreal toad (Bufo boreas) is a large toad species, between 5.6 and 13 cm long, of western North America. It has a white or cream dorsal stripe, and is dusky gray or greenish dorsally with skin glands concentrated within the dark blotches.

In Wyoming, this toad occurs in wet areas in foothills, montane, and subalpine zones from 8,000 to 11,000 feet (2,400 to 3,400 m).

=== Woodhouse's toad ===
Woodhouse's toad, (Bufo woodhousii) is a medium-sized (4 inches or 10 centimetres) true toad, which is native to the United States and Mexico. There are two recognized subspecies. The epithet woodhousii is in honor of the American physician and naturalist Samuel Washington Woodhouse. B. woodhousii tends to hybridize with Bufo americanus in their overlapping ranges.

In Wyoming, this toad is found in floodplains containing permanent water or irrigation runoff in the plains and foothills east of the Continental Divide below 6,000 feet (1,800 m).

=== Great Plains toad ===
The Great Plains toad (Bufo cognatus) is a relatively large species of toad. It ranges from southern Alberta, throughout the western United States, and into northern Mexico. The toad is grey, brown, and green in color, with darker colored blotching. It can grow to anywhere between 2 and 4.5 inches (5.1 and 11.4 cm) in length. Its primary diet is various species of cutworms. It prefers grassland habitat with loose soil that is easy to burrow in. Breeding occurs throughout the spring and summer months, most often immediately after heavy rainfall. In dry areas it may only emerge from its burrow for a few weeks when conditions are right, and only at night, but in areas with permanent water bodies and abundant rain it may be active all day. It has a very loud, harsh mating call.

In Wyoming, this toad is found in plains grasslands, sandhills, agricultural areas, below 6,000 feet (1,800 m).

=== Wyoming toad ===
The Wyoming toad or Baxter's toad (Bufo baxteri or Anaxyrus baxteri) is an extremely rare amphibian that exists only in captivity and within Mortenson Lake National Wildlife Refuge in the U.S. state of Wyoming. The Wyoming toad was listed as an endangered species in 1984, and listed as extinct in the wild since 1991. Before the sharp declines occurred, this toad was classified as a subspecies of the Canadian toad.

=== American bullfrog ===
The American bullfrog (Rana catesbeiana), often simply known as the bullfrog in Canada and the United States, is an aquatic frog, a member of the family Ranidae, or "true frogs", native to much of North America. This is a frog of larger, permanent water bodies, swamps, ponds, and lakes, where it is usually found along the water's edge. On rainy nights, bullfrogs, along with many other amphibians, travel overland, and may be seen in numbers on country roads.

In Wyoming, this frog is found near permanent water below 6,000 feet (1,800 m) on the eastern plains.

=== Columbia spotted frog ===
The Columbia spotted frog (Rana luteiventris) is a North American species of frog. It is a medium-sized frog reaching lengths of up to three and a half inches (8.9 cm). Its color ranges from a dark, olive green to light brown with irregularly-shaped black spots on its back and legs (rendering its name). The belly and upper lip are white in color. Individuals can be distinguished from other Rana species by their shorter back legs, narrow snout and upturned eyes. Since they spend most of their time in the water, they also have more webbing in their hind feet than similar species.

In Wyoming this frog is found in ponds, sloughs, and small streams in the foothills and montane zones.

=== Northern leopard frog ===
The northern leopard frog (Rana pipiens)) is a species of leopard frog from the true frog family native to parts of Canada and United States. The northern leopard frog is a fairly large species of frog reaching about 11 centimeters (4.3 inches) in length. It varies from green to brown in dorsal colour with large dark circular spots on its back, sides and legs. Northern leopard frogs have a wide range of habitats. They are found in permanent ponds, swamps, marshes and slow moving streams throughout forest, open and urban areas. They normally inhabit water bodies with abundant aquatic vegetation. They are well adapted to cold and can be found above 3,000 meters (9,800 feet) asl. This species was once quite common through parts of western Canada until declines started occurring during the 1970s. The population decline is thought to have been caused by pollution drift from the United States falling in the form of acid rain. Many populations of northern leopard frogs have not yet recovered from these declines.

In Wyoming, this frog is found in swampy cattail marshes and beaver ponds in the plains, foothills, and montane zones up to 9,000 feet (2,700 m).

=== Wood frog ===
The Wood frog (Rana sylvatica) has a broad distribution over North America, extending from the southern Appalachians to the boreal forest with several notable disjunct populations including lowland eastern North Carolina.

In Wyoming, this frog is found in beaver ponds, small lakes, slow moving streams, wet meadows, willow thickets, in the montane zone usually at or near 9,000 feet (2,700 m).

== Reptiles ==
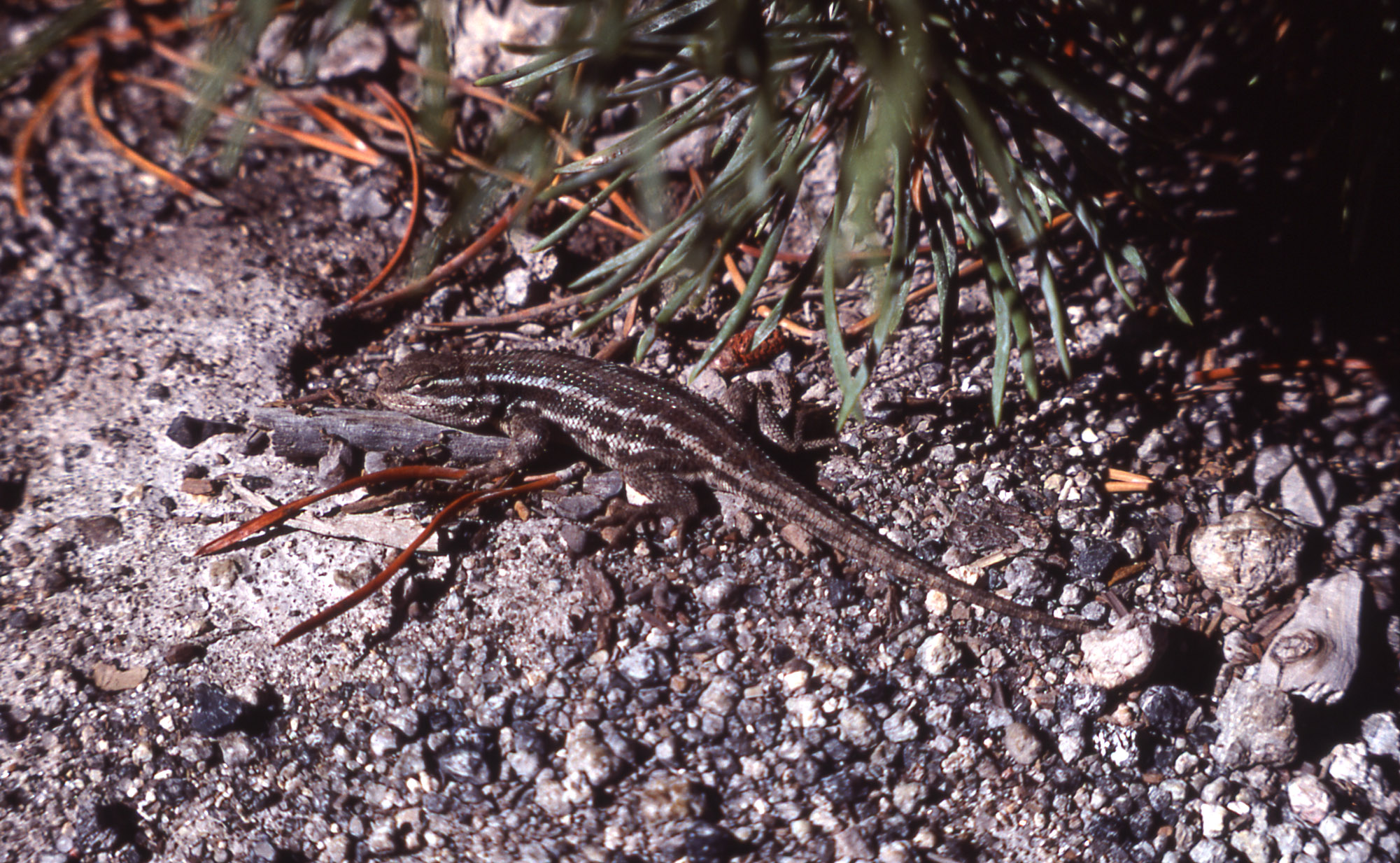
Sagebrush lizard

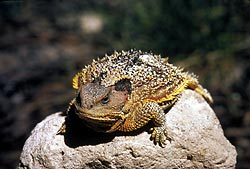
Short-horned lizard

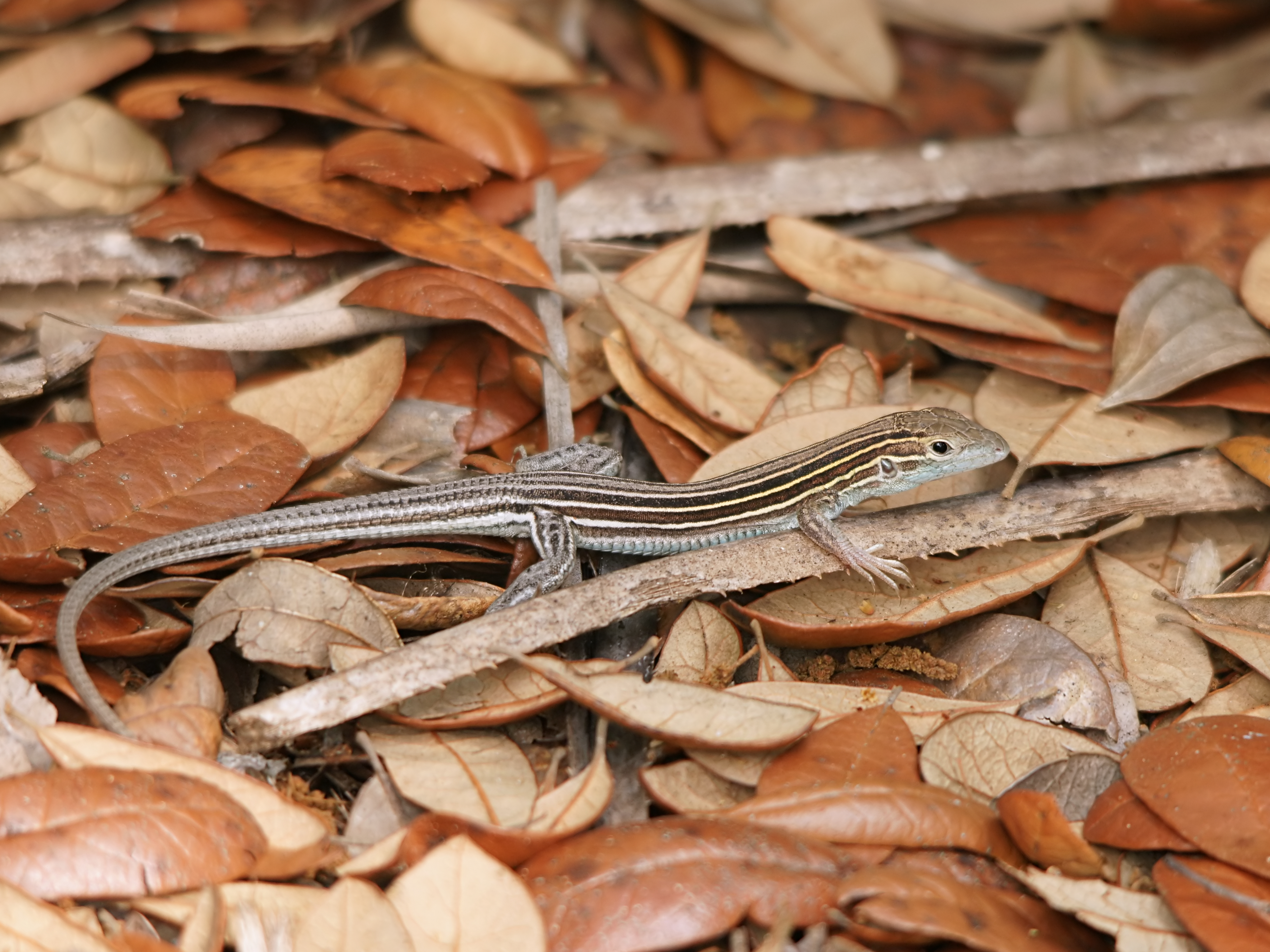
Prairie racerunner

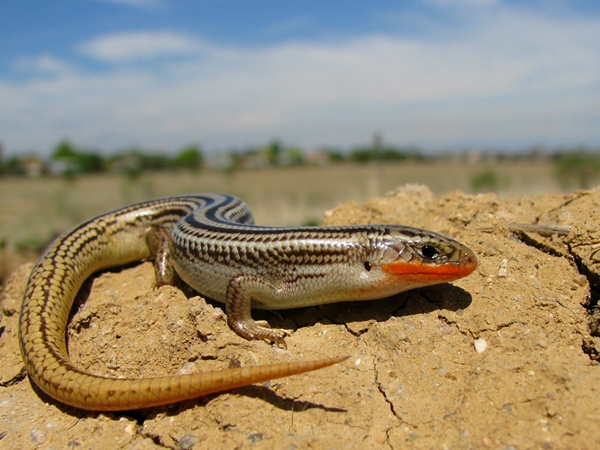
Many-lined skink

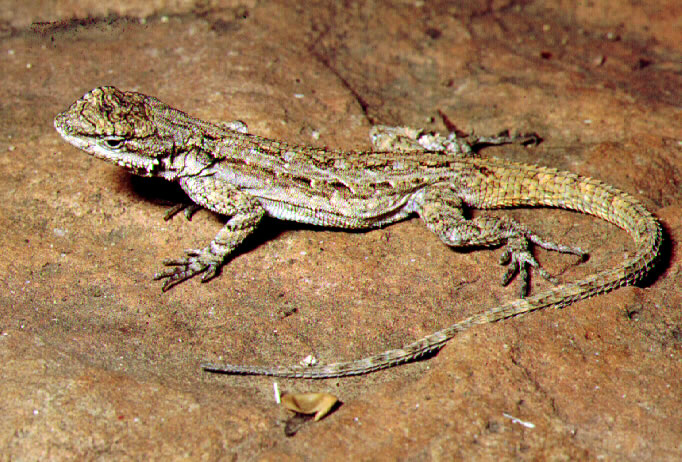
Ornate tree lizard

Earless lizard

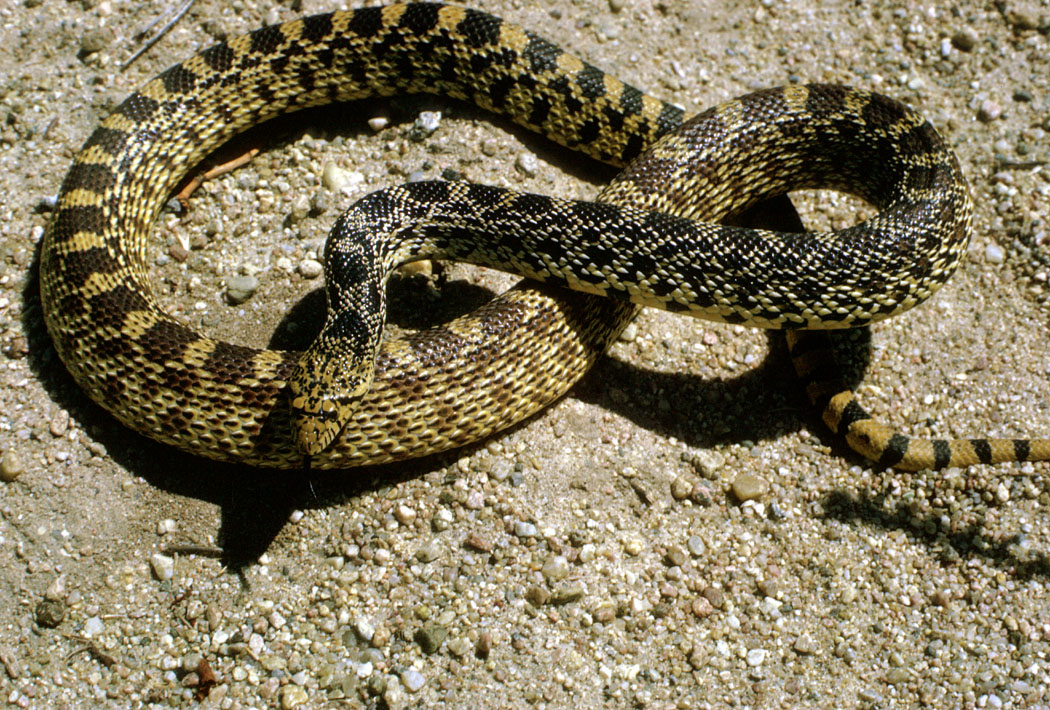
Gopher snake

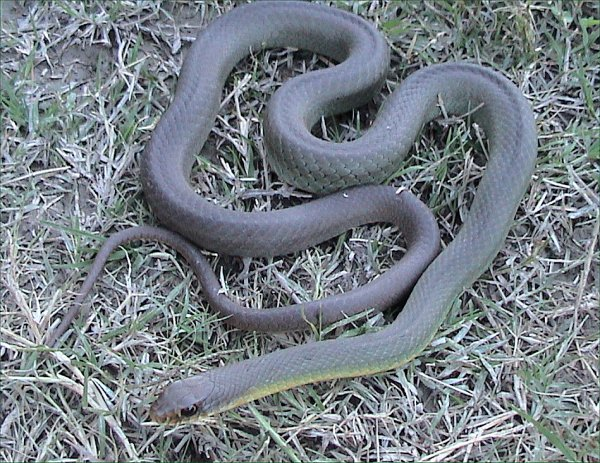
Eastern racer

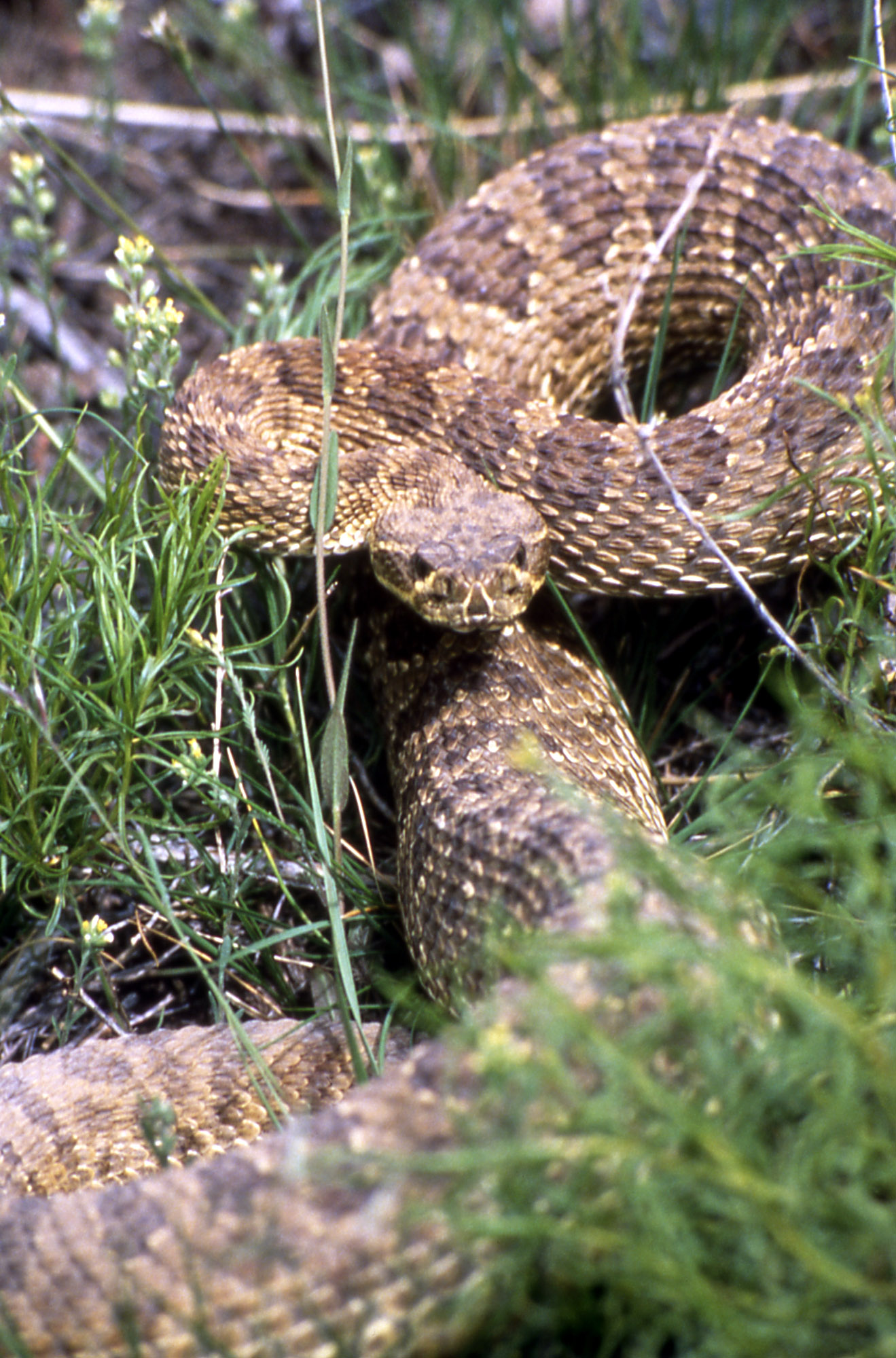
Prairie rattlesnake

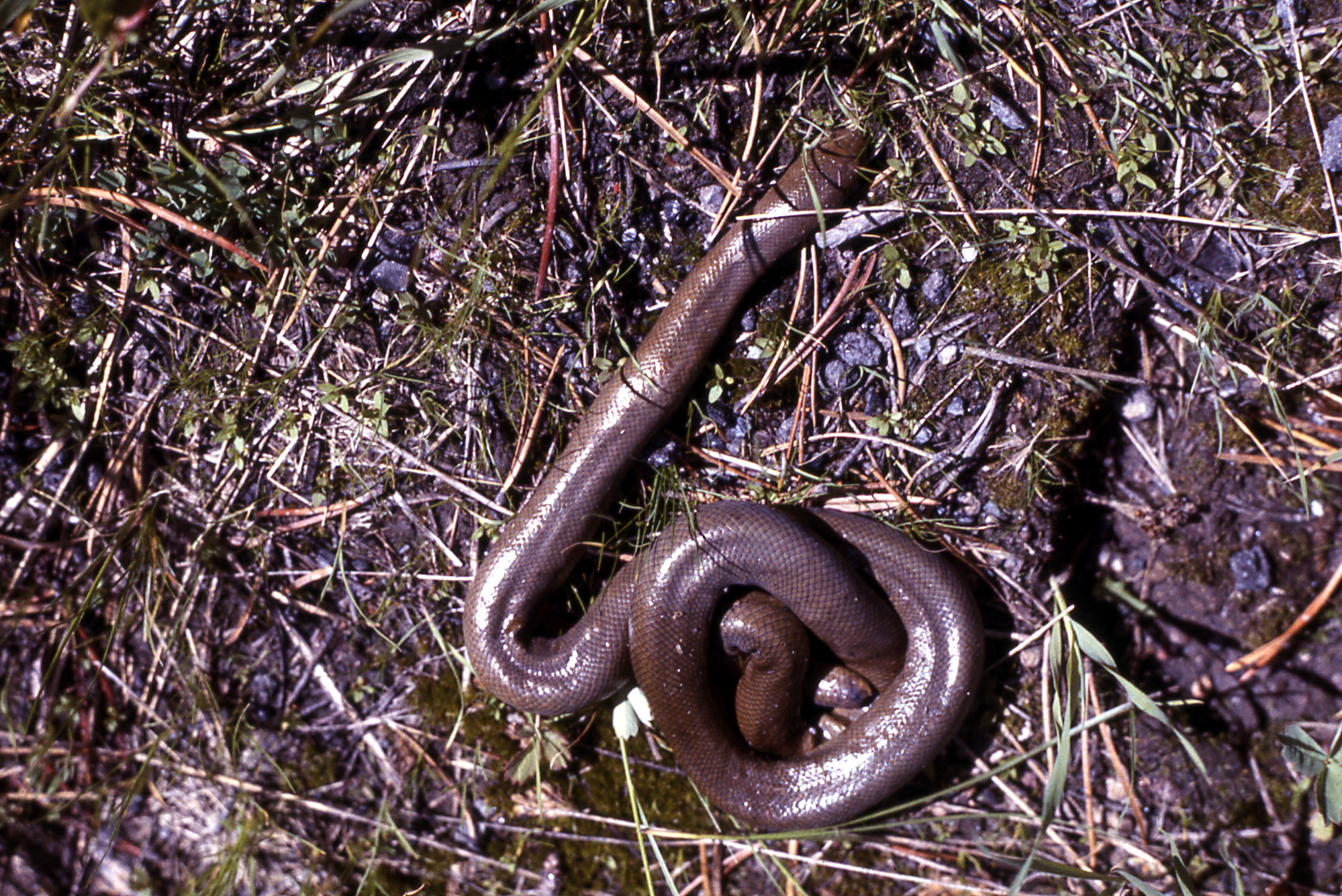
Rubber boa

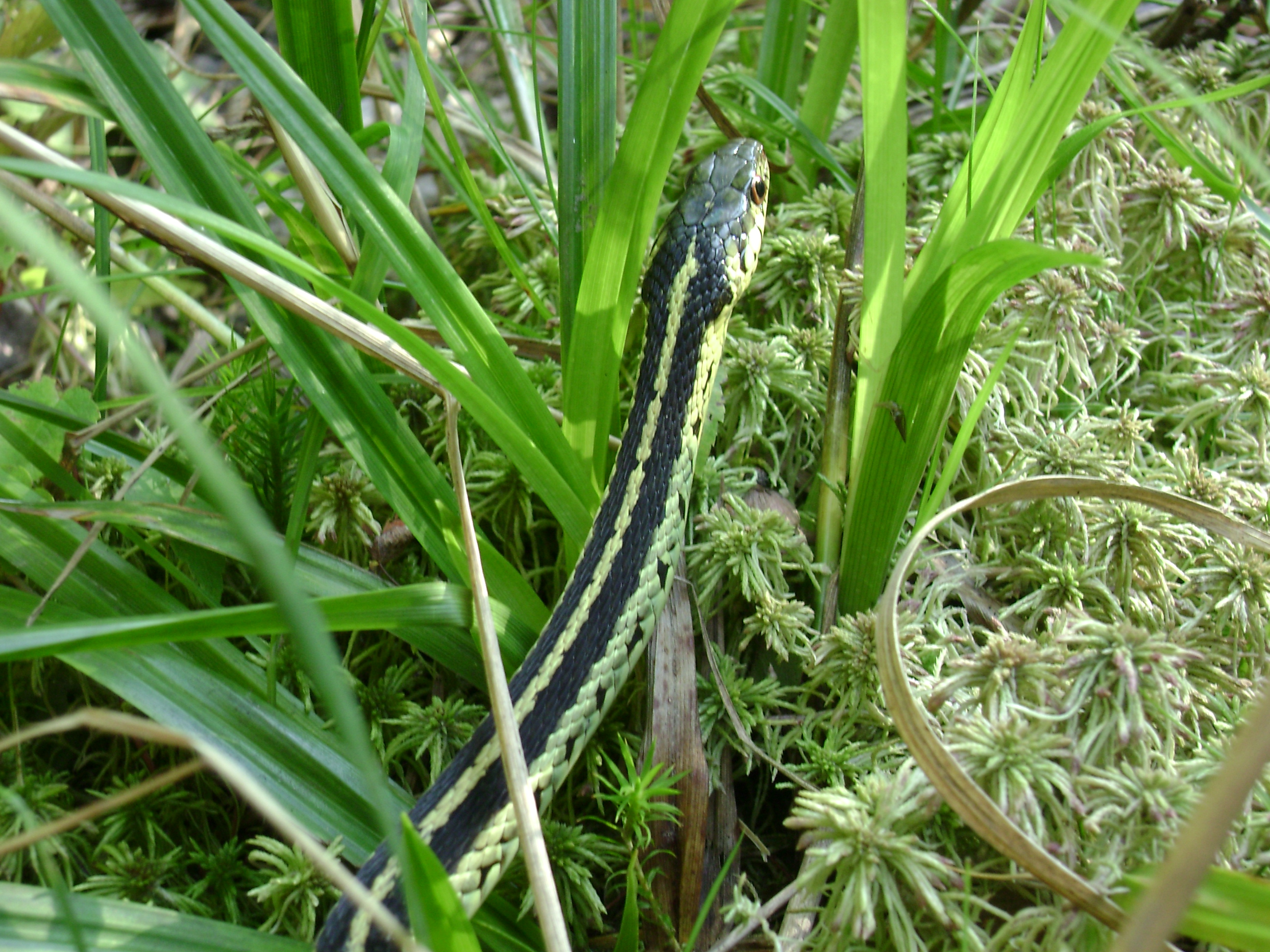
Common garter snake

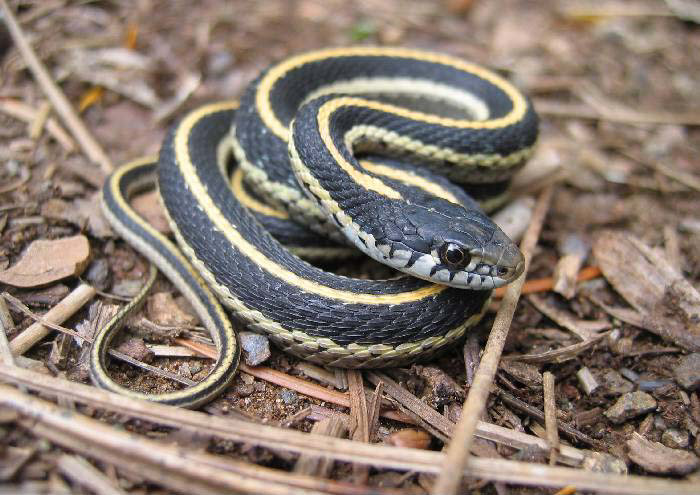
Terrestrial garter snake

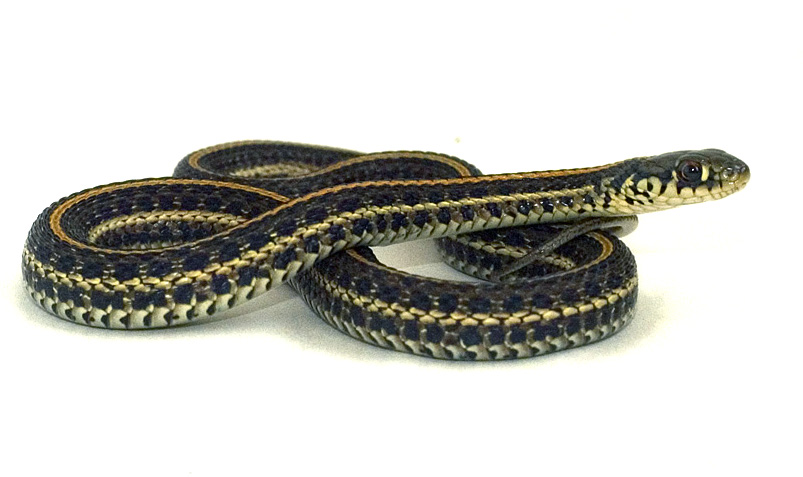
Plains garter snake

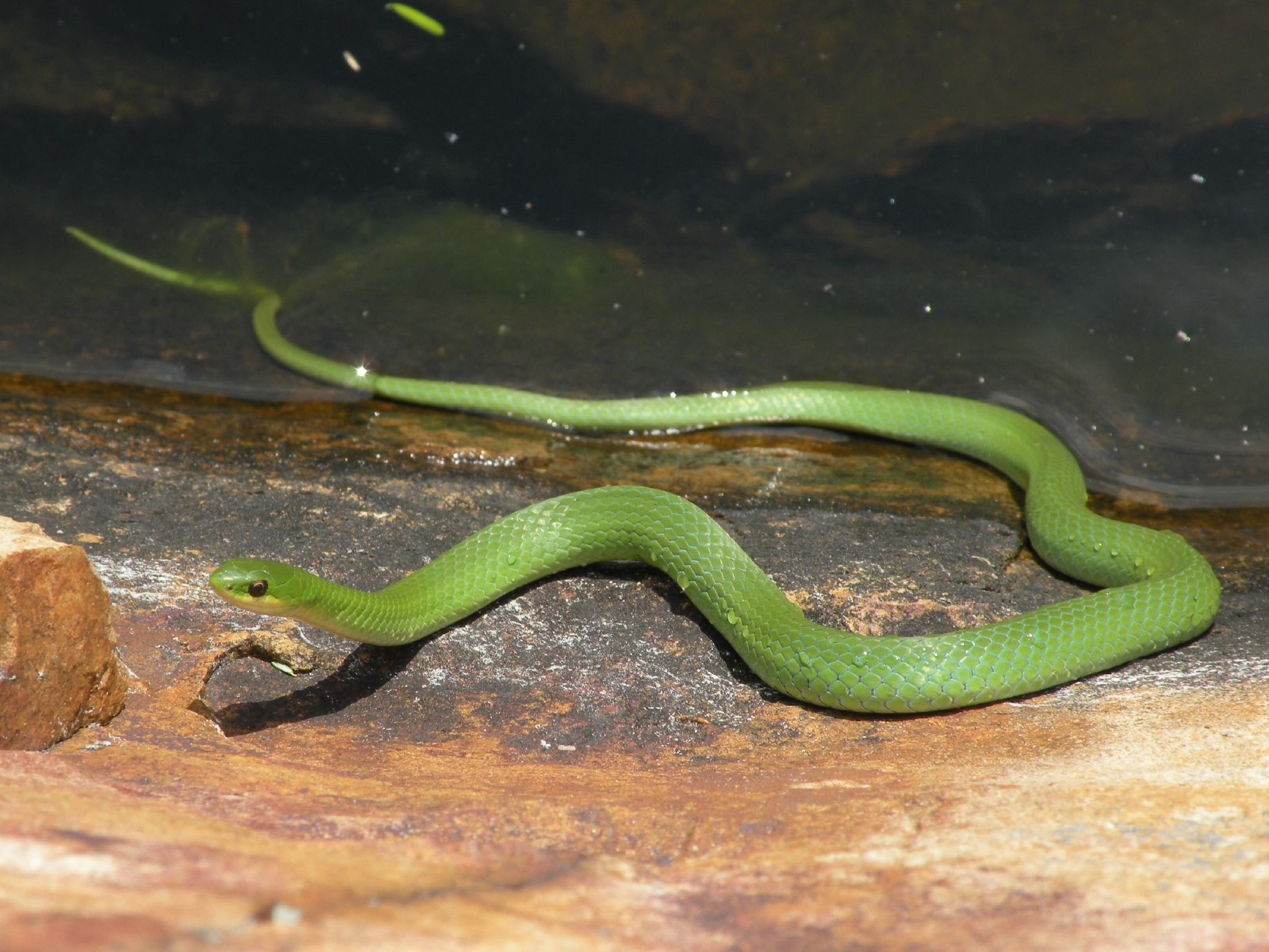
Smooth greensnake

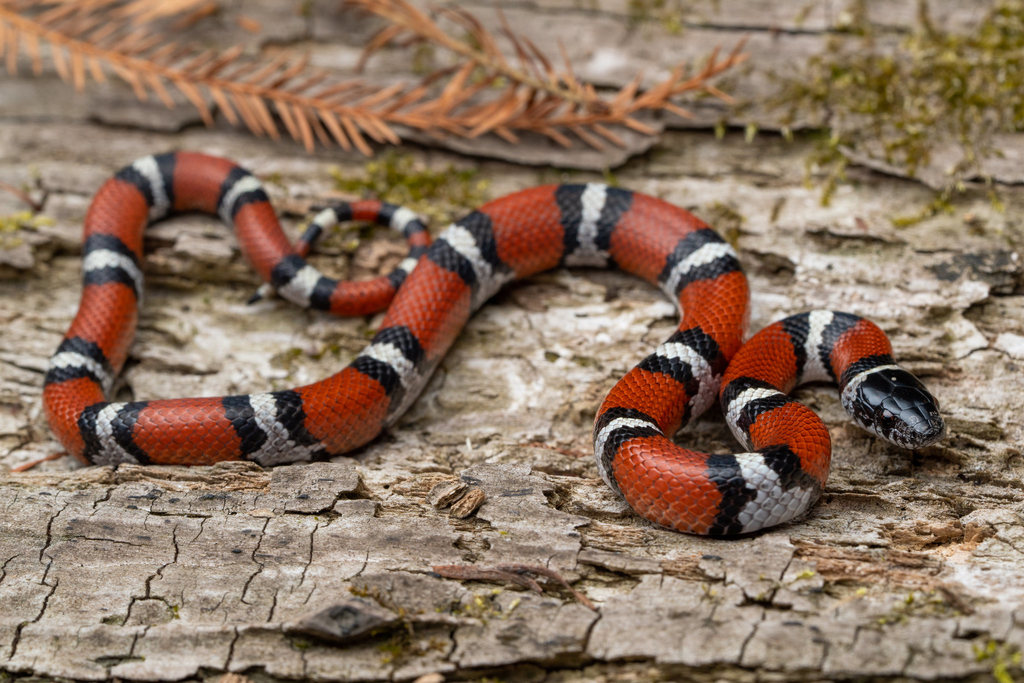
Western milksnake

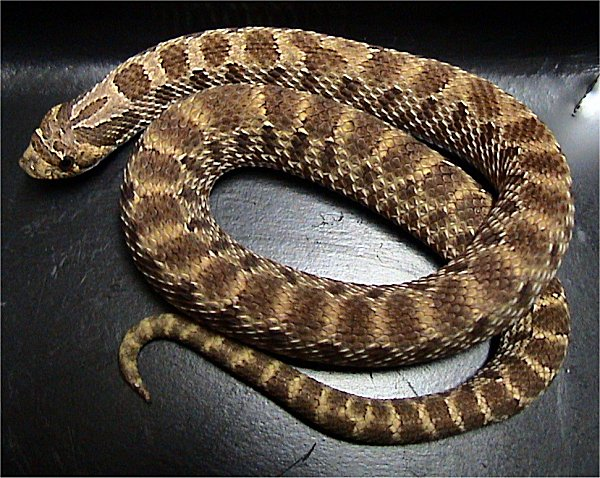
Western hog-nosed snake

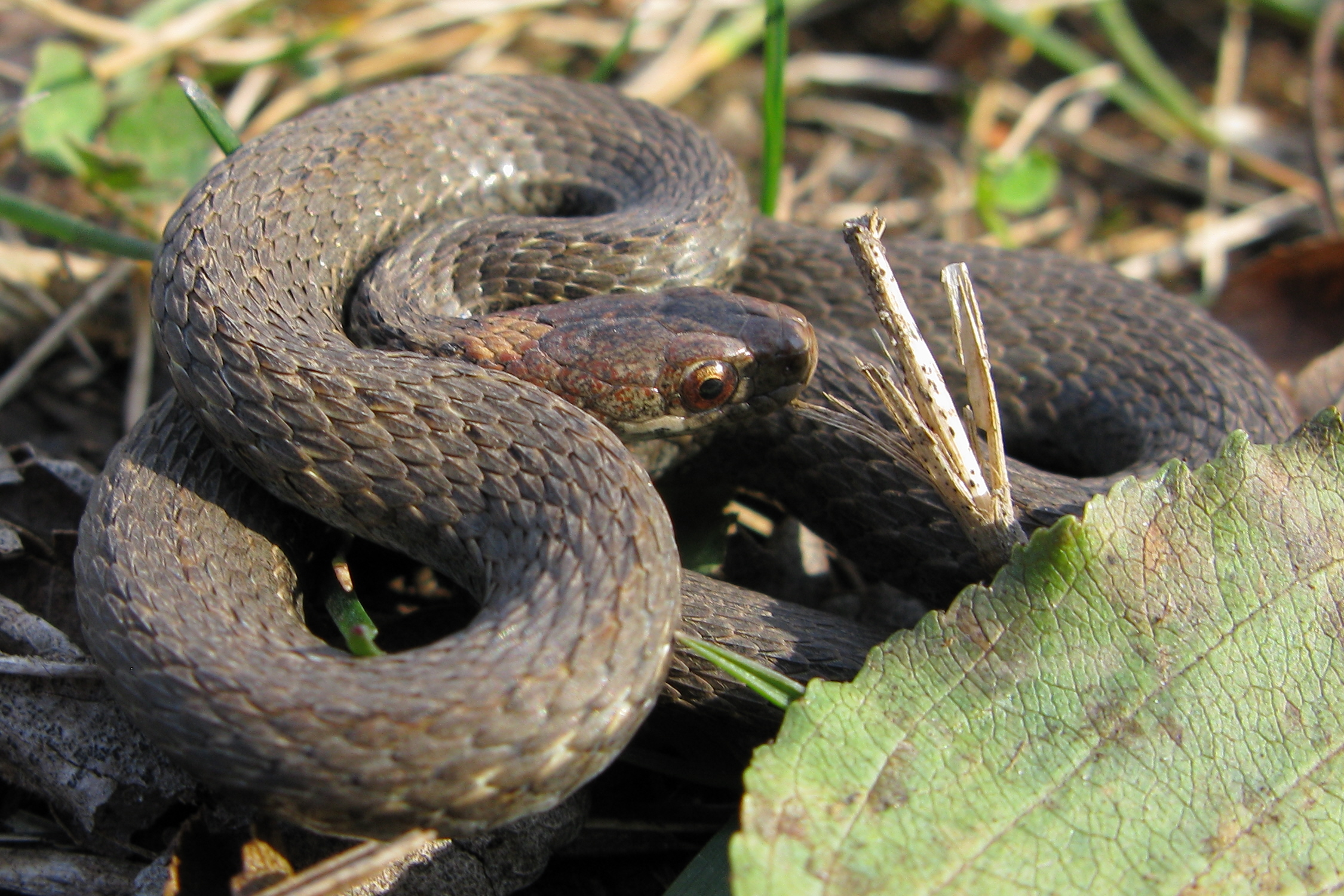
Redbelly snake

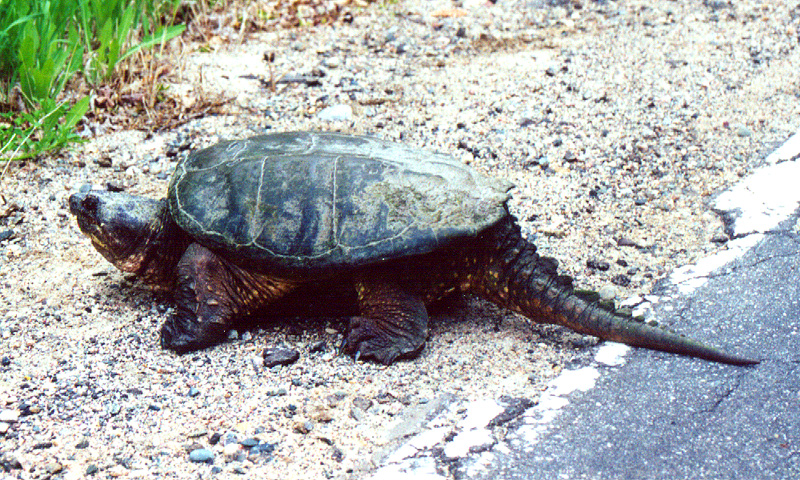
Snapping turtle

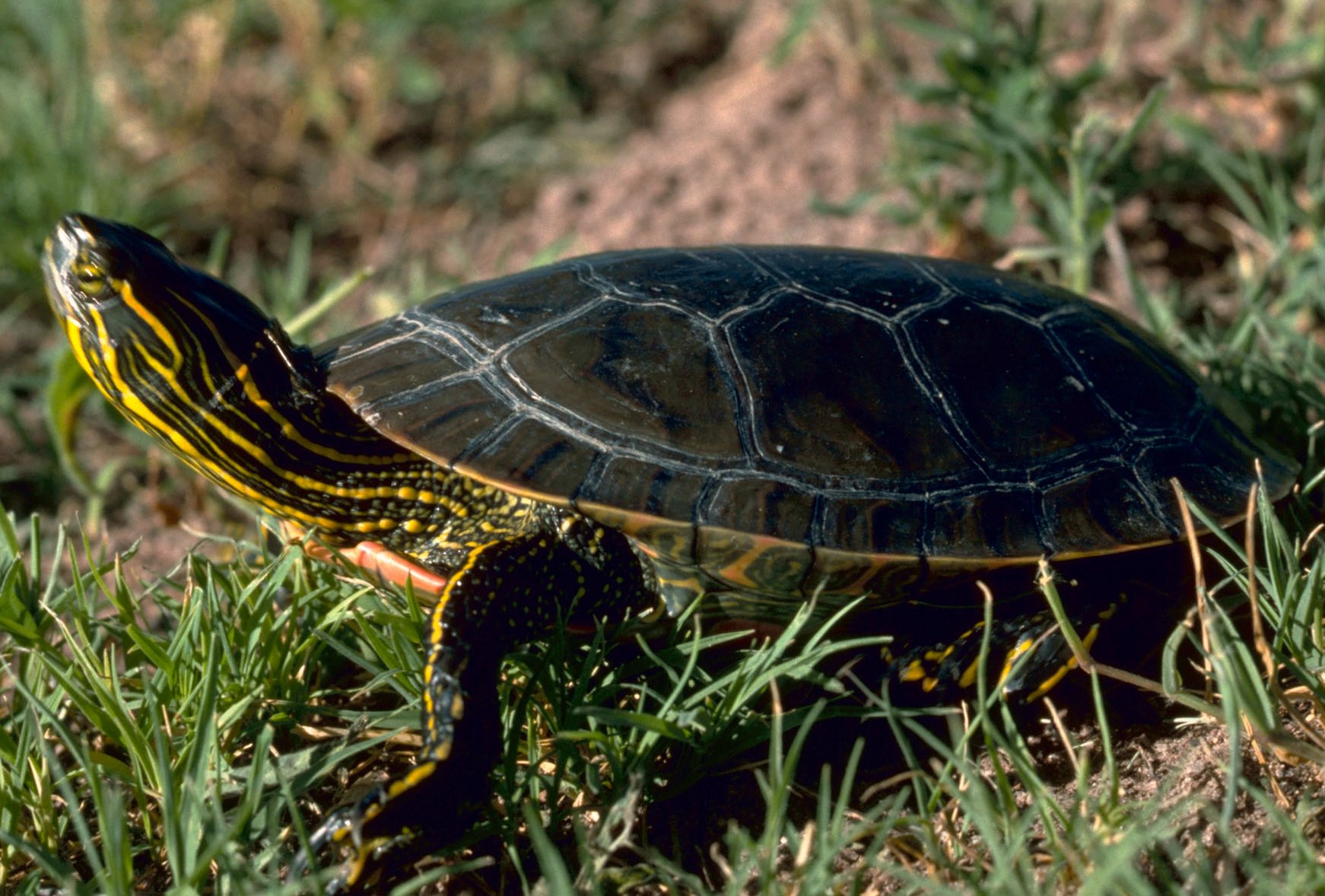
Western painted turtle

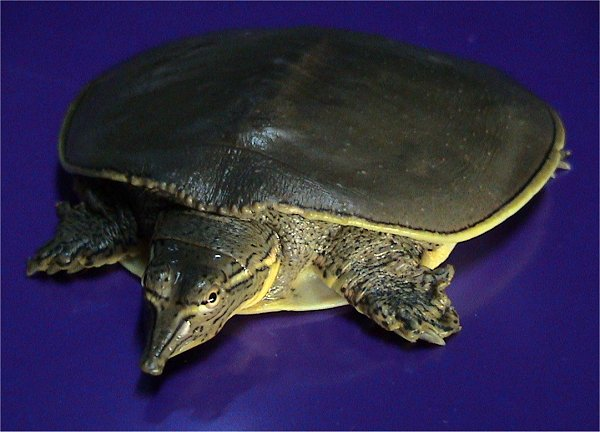
Spiny softshell

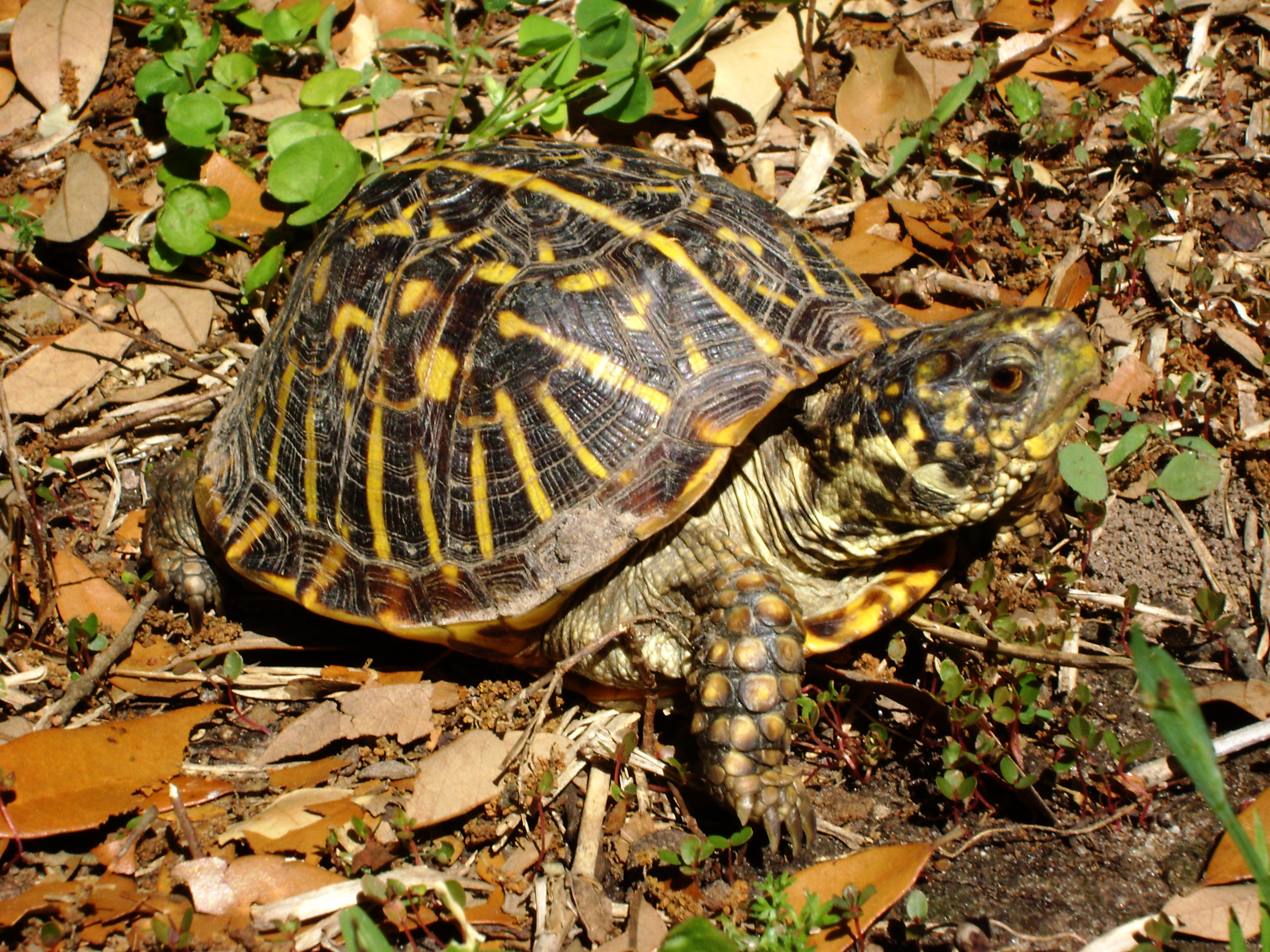
Ornate box turtle

=== Prairie racerunner ===
The six-lined racerunner (Cnemidophorus sexlineatus) is a species of lizard found in the United States, from Wyoming across the Great Plains east to Rhode Island, south to Florida and west to southern Texas, and in northern Mexico, in Tamaulipas.

In Wyoming, the sub-species C. s. viridis is found in plains grasslands, sandhills, sandy or gravelly streambanks, and stream floodplains.

=== Common sagebrush lizard ===
The sagebrush lizard (Sceloporus graciosus graciosus) is a common lizard found in mid to high latitudes in the Western United States of America. It belongs to the genus Sceloporus (spiny lizards) in the reptile family Phrynosomatidae. Named after the sagebrush plants near which it is commonly found, the sagebrush lizard has keeled and spiny scales running along its dorsal surface.

In Wyoming, the lizard is found in rock outcrops in sagebrush, juniper, semi-arid shrublands, and mountain foothills shrublands, usually below 6,000 feet (1,800 m). It occurs in association with geothermal features in Yellowstone National Park at 7,500 feet (2,300 m).

=== Mountain short-horned lizard ===
The mountain short-horned lizard, also called Hernandez's short-horned lizard or the greater short-horned lizard, (Phrynosoma hernandesi) is a diurnal species of phrynosomatid lizard. It is an insectivore, feeding mostly on ants, though will also eat young snakes. The lizards are found throughout the mountain ranges in the western U.S. (as south as Texas) and into Canada. It is found from sea level to over 10,000 feet in elevation. It was formerly classified as Phrynosoma douglassi hernandesi. It was named for Francisco Hernández Médico, a Spanish explorer who in 1651 wrote one of the first accounts of horned lizards.

In Wyoming, this lizard is found in grasslands, sagebrush-grasslands.

=== Eastern fence lizard ===
The eastern fence lizard (Sceloporus undulatus) is a medium-sized species of lizard found along forest edges, rock piles, and rotting logs or stumps in the eastern United States. It is sometimes referred to as the prairie lizard, fence swift, or gray lizard.

In Wyoming, the sub-species S. u. elongatus, the northern plateau lizard is found in rock outcrops and canyon walls in sagebrush communities. The sub-species S. u. erythrocheilus, the Red-lipped Plateau lizard is restricted to rock cliffs and large areas of boulders along the hogback on the east edge of the Laramie Range in Laramie, Platte, and Converse counties. The sub-species S. u. garmani, the Northern Prairie lizard is found in sandy areas with low shrubs in grassland communities, or sandstone and limestone outcrops in scarp woodland communities.

=== Many-lined skink ===
The many-lined skink (Eumeces multivirgatus) is a medium-sized member of the Eumeces skinks, a kind of lizard, living in North America. The range of E. multivirgatus is limited in the north by southern South Dakota, Nebraska, and Wyoming and extends in the south until the Arkansas River in Colorado. E. multivirgatus prefers sandy soil and occurs in habitat below 5,500 feet (1,700 m).

In Wyoming, this lizard is found in grassland communities on the prairies and in scarp woodlands. It usually occurs under surface objects such as flat rocks or boards.

=== Cliff tree lizard ===
The tree lizard or ornate tree lizard (Urosaurus ornatus) is a species of lizard that is native to the southwestern United States and northern Mexico. The species has been used to research the physiological changes in the body during the fight-or-flight response as related to stress and aggressive competition.

In Wyoming, the sub-species U. o. wrighti is found in cliffs and rocky canyon slopes in sagebrush desert communities.

=== Great Plains earless lizard ===
The lesser earless lizard (Holbrookia maculata) is a species of phrynosomid lizard endemic to the southwestern and central United States and northern Mexico. It is found in the states of Arizona, New Mexico, Texas, Utah, Colorado, Kansas, Oklahoma, Nebraska, South Dakota and Wyoming, as well as in the Mexican states of Sonora, Chihuahua, Coahuila, Sinaloa, Durango, Zacatecas, San Luis Potosí and Nuevo León.

In Wyoming, the sub-species H. m. maculata is found in plains grassland communities with yucca and exposed sandy areas.

=== Gophersnake ===
The gophersnake or bullsnake (Pituophis catenifer sayi) is a large non-venomous colubrid snake, widespread in the central part of the United States, northern Mexico, and southern Canada. It is a subspecies of the gopher snake (Pituophis catenifer). The epithet sayi is in honor of zoologist Thomas Say.

In Wyoming, the bullsnake is found in plains grasslands, sagebrush grasslands, sandhills, riparian shrub, marshes, rocky canyons, mountain foothills shrub, agricultural areas, and urban areas. The sub-species Pituophis catenifer deserticola, the Great Basin Gophersnake is found in sagebrush communities and desert habitats.

=== Milk snake ===
The western milk snake (Lampropeltis gentilis) is a species of king snake. The subspecies have strikingly different appearance, and many of them have their own common names. They are distributed through most of the western continental United States. They grow 20 to 60 inches (51 to 152 cm) long.

In Wyoming, the species, the western milksnake is found in grasslands, sandhills, and scarp woodlands, usually below 6,000 feet (1,800 m).

=== Prairie rattlesnake ===
The prairie rattlesnake (Crotalus viridis viridis) is a venomous pitviper species native to the western United States, southwestern Canada, and northern Mexico.

In Wyoming, this snake is found in plains, foothills, and scarp woodlands, especially near granite or limestone outcrops. The sub-species Crotalus viridis concolor, the midget faded rattlesnake is found in rock outcrops in sagebrush desert communities. Its range is restricted to the lower Green River Valley from the cities of Green River and Rock Springs south to the Utah-Wyoming state line.

=== Rubber boa ===
The rubber boa (Charina bottae) is a snake in the family Boidae and genus Charina. Boidae consists of the nonvenomous snakes commonly called boas and consists of 43 species. The genus Charina consists of four species, three of which are found in North America, and one species found in Africa.

In Wyoming, this boa is found in near water and beneath logs, flat rocks, and other surface objects in the foothills and lower montane zones.

=== Plains garter snake ===
The plains garter snake (Thamnophis radix) is a species of garter snake native to most of the Central United States stretching as far north as Canada and as far south as Texas. It has a distinctive orange or yellow stripe that goes from its head to tail, the rest of its body is mainly a gray-green color. The snake is commonly found living near water sources such as streams and ponds, but can also be found in urban areas and vacant lots.

In Wyoming, this snake is found near small streams, sloughs, marshes, and ponds. May be found in urban areas, dry grasslands, sandhills.

=== Common garter snake ===
The valley garter snake, (Thamnophis sirtalis fitchi) is a subspecies of the common garter snake. It is a snake indigenous to North America. Most garter snakes have a pattern of yellow stripes on a brown background and their average length is about 1 to 1.5 metres (3.3 to 4.9 ft). The common garter snake is a diurnal snake. In summer, it is most active in the morning and late afternoon; in cooler seasons or climates, it restricts its activity to the warm afternoons.

In Wyoming, this snake is found in plains, foothills, montane zones, and usually near permanent water sources. The sub-species T. s.parietalis, the Red-sided Gartersnake is found near marshes, ponds, and small streams.

=== Terrestrial garter snake ===
The wandering garter snake (Thamnophis elegans vagrans) is a subspecies of the western terrestrial garter snake, a species of colubrid snake residing only in southwestern Canada, and the western United States. Seven subspecies are currently recognized. Most snakes have a yellow, light orange, or white dorsal stripe, accompanied by two stripes on its side of the same color. Some varieties have red or black spots between the dorsal stripe and the side stripes. This snake often inhabits coniferous forests, and is relatively aquatic.

In Wyoming, this snake is found in all habitat zones except alpine, usually near water.

=== Eastern racer ===
The eastern racer (Coluber constrictor) is a species of non-venomous, colubrid snake. They are primarily found throughout the United States, east of the Rocky Mountains, but they range north into Canada, and south into Mexico, Guatemala and Belize. Racers typically grow to around 3½ foot (107 cm) long, but some subspecies are capable of attaining lengths of 6 feet (1.8 metres). Their patterns vary widely between subspecies. Most are solid colored as their common names imply, black racers, brown racers, blue racers or green racers. Runner is sometimes used instead of racer in their common name.

In Wyoming, the sub-species C. c. flaviventris is found woodlands and scarp woodlands within the plains and foothills zones, often near water.

=== Smooth greensnake ===
The smooth green snake (Opheodrys vernalis, sometimes Liochlorophis vernalis) is a non-venomous North American snake, found in Ontario, Eastern Canada, and almost every northern state in the U.S. It also sometimes called a grass snake. It is a snake of increasing conservation concern in some U.S. states. The snake is bright green and found mainly in moist meadows, prairies and clearings in coniferous forest. They are almost entirely insectivorous eating mainly crickets, grasshoppers, and smooth caterpillars.

In Wyoming, this snake is found under rocks, logs, or other surface objects in forests within the foothills and montane zones. Usually associated with lush vegetation.

=== Black Hills red-bellied snake ===
The red-bellied snake (Storeria occipitomaculata) is very small brown or gray snake with faint stripes down its back. The belly is red, pink, or orange. Adult length is 8 to 16 inches. Red-bellied snakes inhabit both fields and woods, but are most often found under boards and other objects at the edges of lumber piles or trash dumps. They feed on worms, slugs, and snails.

In Wyoming, the sub-species S. o. pahasapae is found near water under flat rocks, logs, and other surface objects in moist woodland communities of the Black Hills.

=== Western hog-nosed snake ===
The western hog-nosed snake (Heterodon nasicus) is a harmless colubrid species found in North America and northern Mexico. The Western Hognose snake is a light sandy brown in color, with darker brown or gray blotching, their coloration is not nearly as variable as the Eastern Hognose, Heterodon platirhinos, but they often have an ink-black and white or yellow checker patterned belly, sometimes accented with orange. They are very stout for their size (a full grown 24-inch female is as bulky as a five-foot corn snake) and can grow from 15 to 33 inches in length, with females generally being larger than males. The characteristic of all hognose snakes is their upturned snout, which aids in digging in the soil. Hognose snakes are considered to be rear-fanged venomous, but are not considered to pose any danger to humans and will only bite as a feeding response, rarely in defense.

In Wyoming, the plains hog-nosed snake, H. n. nasicus is found in burrows in soft soil or sand in plains grasslands and sandhills.

=== Snapping turtle ===
The common snapping turtle (Chelydra serpentina) is a large freshwater turtle of the family Chelydridae. Its natural range extends from southeastern Canada, southwest to the Rocky Mountains (and beyond, where introduced), throughout Mexico, and as far south as Ecuador. This species and the larger alligator snapping turtle are both widely referred to as snapping turtles or snappers (though the common snapping turtle, as its name implies, is much more widespread overall).

In Wyoming, this turtle is found in permanent lakes, ponds, and large streams, below 6,000 feet (1,800 m).

=== Spiny softshell ===
The spiny softshell turtle (Apalone spinifera, formerly Trionyx spiniferus) is a species of softshelled turtle, one of the largest freshwater turtle species in North America. They get their name from the spiny, cone-like projections on the leading edge of their carapace, which are not scutes (scales). The spiny softshell has a wide range, extending throughout much of the United States, as well as north into the Canadian provinces of Ontario and Quebec, and south into the Mexican states of Tamaulipas, Nuevo León, Coahuila, Chihuahua, Baja California, Morelos, and Honduras.

In Wyoming, the sub-species A. s. hartwegi is found in permanent lakes, ponds, large streams, below 6,000 feet (1,800 m).

=== Ornate box turtle ===
The ornate box turtle (Terrapene ornata ornata) is one of only two terrestrial species of turtles native to the Great Plains of the United States. It is one of the two different subspecies of Terrapene ornata. It is the state reptile of Kansas. It is a relatively small turtle, that is currently not endangered or threatened but is of concern and protected in six Midwestern states (Colorado, Iowa, Indiana, Nebraska, Kansas, and Wisconsin).

In Wyoming, this turtle is found in grasslands and sandhills in Goshen County.

=== Western painted turtle ===
The painted turtle (Chrysemys picta) is the most widespread native turtle of North America. It lives in slow-moving fresh waters, from southern Canada to Louisiana and northern Mexico, and from the Atlantic to the Pacific. The turtle is the only species of the genus Chrysemys, which is part of the pond turtle family, Emydidae.

In Wyoming, the sub-species C. p. bellii is found in permanent ponds, reservoirs, marshes, and slow moving streams, below 6,000 feet (1,800 m).

== See also ==
- Birds of Wyoming
- Mammals of Wyoming
