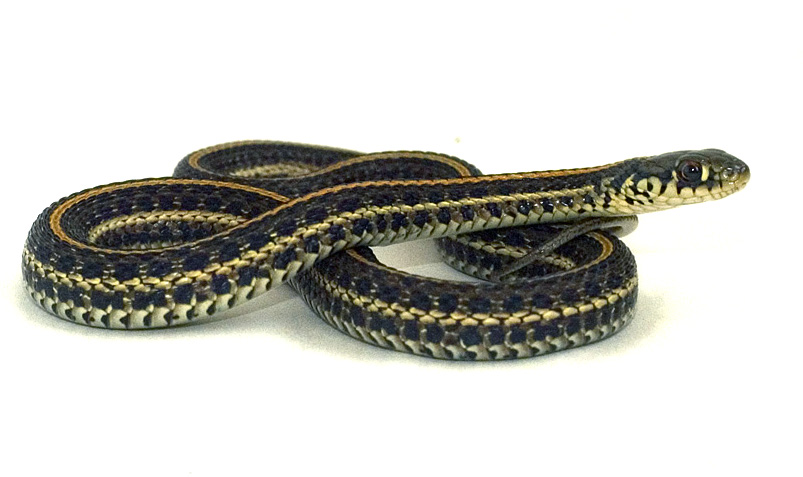

Conservation status
- Least Concern (IUCN 3.1)

Scientific classification
- Kingdom: Animalia
- Phylum: Chordata
- Class: Reptilia
- Order: Squamata
- Suborder: Serpentes
- Family: Colubridae
- Genus: Thamnophis
- Species: T. radix

Binomial name
- Thamnophis radix (Baird & Girard, 1853)

Synonyms
- Eutainia radix Baird & Girard, 1853; Tropidonotus sirtalis var. radix — Jan, 1865; Tropidonotus ordinatus var. radix — Boulenger, 1893; Eutaenia radix — Cope, 1900; Thamnophis radix — Stejneger & Barbour, 1917

= Plains garter snake =

Species of snake

The plains garter snake (Thamnophis radix) is a species of garter snake native to most of the central United States as far north as Canada and as far south as Texas. It has a distinctive orange or yellow stripe from its head to tail, and the rest of its body is mainly a gray-green color. The snake is commonly found living near water sources such as streams and ponds, but can also be found in urban areas and vacant lots. Although the IUCN lists the species as "Least Concern", some states have given it their own special status. This species is mildly venomous, although the venom is not toxic to humans.

== Description ==
=== Physical ===
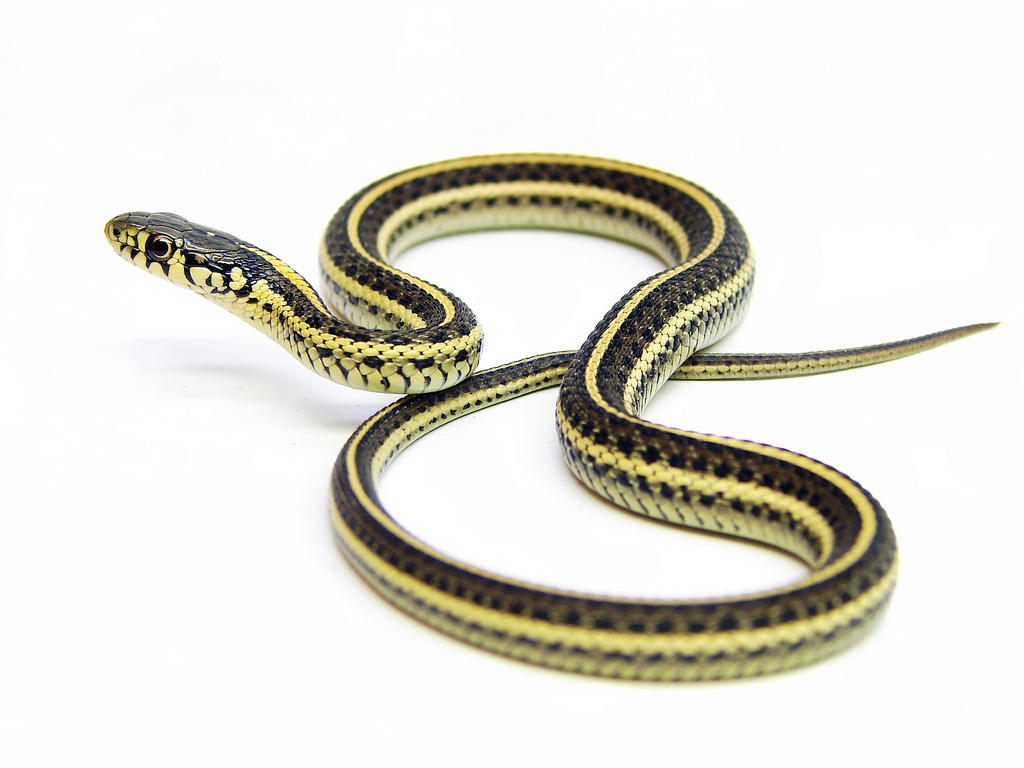
Thamnophis radix

The plains garter snake has either an orange or yellow stripe down its back and distinctive black bars on its lip. The stripe normally starts at the head and continues all the way to the tail tip. Lateral stripes are located on the third and fourth scale rows and are normally a greenish-yellow color. Its belly is gray-green with small dark spots along the edges. Most have distinctive light yellow spots on the top of the head. The snake is described as medium-sized and is on average around 3 ft (0.91 m).

=== Behavior ===
Described as "one of the most cold-tolerant snakes", on warmer winter days, it often comes out of hibernation to bask in the sun. It is most active between April and late October depending on location. Mating normally takes place in April or May and birth takes place between August and October. Courtship usually occurs near the communal hibernation site, and polygynous mating systems have been observed. The snake's typical diet consists of earthworms, slugs, and small amphibians, including the larvae of salamanders. It has also been observed eating small mammals and birds, such as bank swallows and eastern meadowlarks.

== Habitat ==
The plains garter snake is commonly found in meadows and prairies adjacent to water sources, such as marshes, streams, and ponds. In built-up areas of the Chicago area, it has been observed in abandoned buildings, trash heaps, and vacant lots. Populations in urban and suburban areas have been greatly reduced due to building activities and pesticide use. Its habitat range overlaps with that of the common garter snake (Thamnophis sirtalis) in many areas, and it is thought the two species may hybridize.

=== Geographic range ===
The snake ranges across a broad area of North America from as far north as central Alberta to as far south as Northern Texas and New Mexico. In the United States, it is also found in Iowa, eastern Wyoming, northern Kentucky, eastern Colorado, Minnesota, southern Wisconsin, Illinois, northwestern Indiana, Oklahoma, Nebraska and the northern half of Missouri. A small population is also in Ohio. In Canada, the species is also found in Manitoba. It can be found at elevations from 400 to 7,500 feet, but prefers to stay under 6,000 feet.

== Subspecies ==
Formerly, two subspecies of the plains garter snake were widely recognized, but most authorities have since dropped recognition of them. The first, T. r. radix, was commonly referred to as the eastern plains garter snake, while T. r. haydeni (Kennicott, 1860) was commonly referred to as the western plains garter snake. However, the distinction between the two of them is weak, partly based on the number of scales and partly on slight coloration differences, with T. r. haydeni said to have cleaner markings and more ventral and neck scales. As the two subspecies share the same habitat in many regions of the United States, further complicated by their strikingly similar appearance, many authorities now do not recognize them.

The subspecific name haydeni was in honor of American geologist Ferdinand Vandeveer Hayden.

== Conservation ==
The plains garter snake is listed as Least Concern (IUCN 3.1) by the IUCN Red List due to the snake's ability to modify its habitat, its wide distribution and its presumed large population. However, the species is considered to be endangered in Ohio and it is on a state list of endangered species. In Wisconsin, it is a species of special concern.
