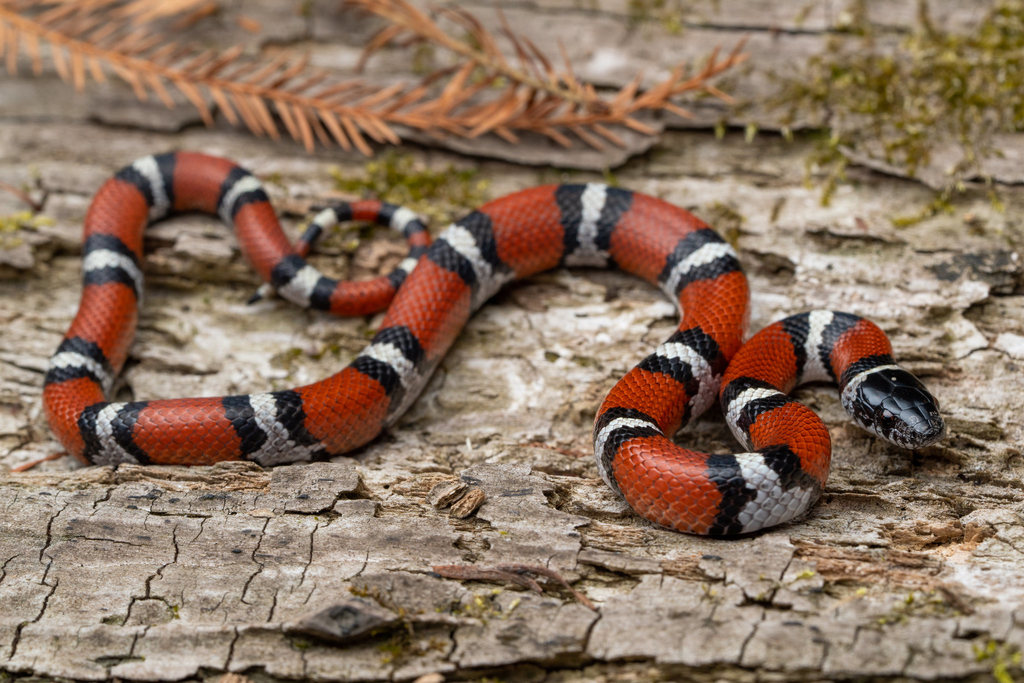
- Western milksnake found in Orleans Parish, Louisiana.

Conservation status
- Least Concern (IUCN 3.1)

Scientific classification
- Kingdom: Animalia
- Phylum: Chordata
- Class: Reptilia
- Order: Squamata
- Suborder: Serpentes
- Family: Colubridae
- Genus: Lampropeltis
- Species: L. gentilis

Binomial name
- Lampropeltis gentilis (Baird & Girard, 1853)
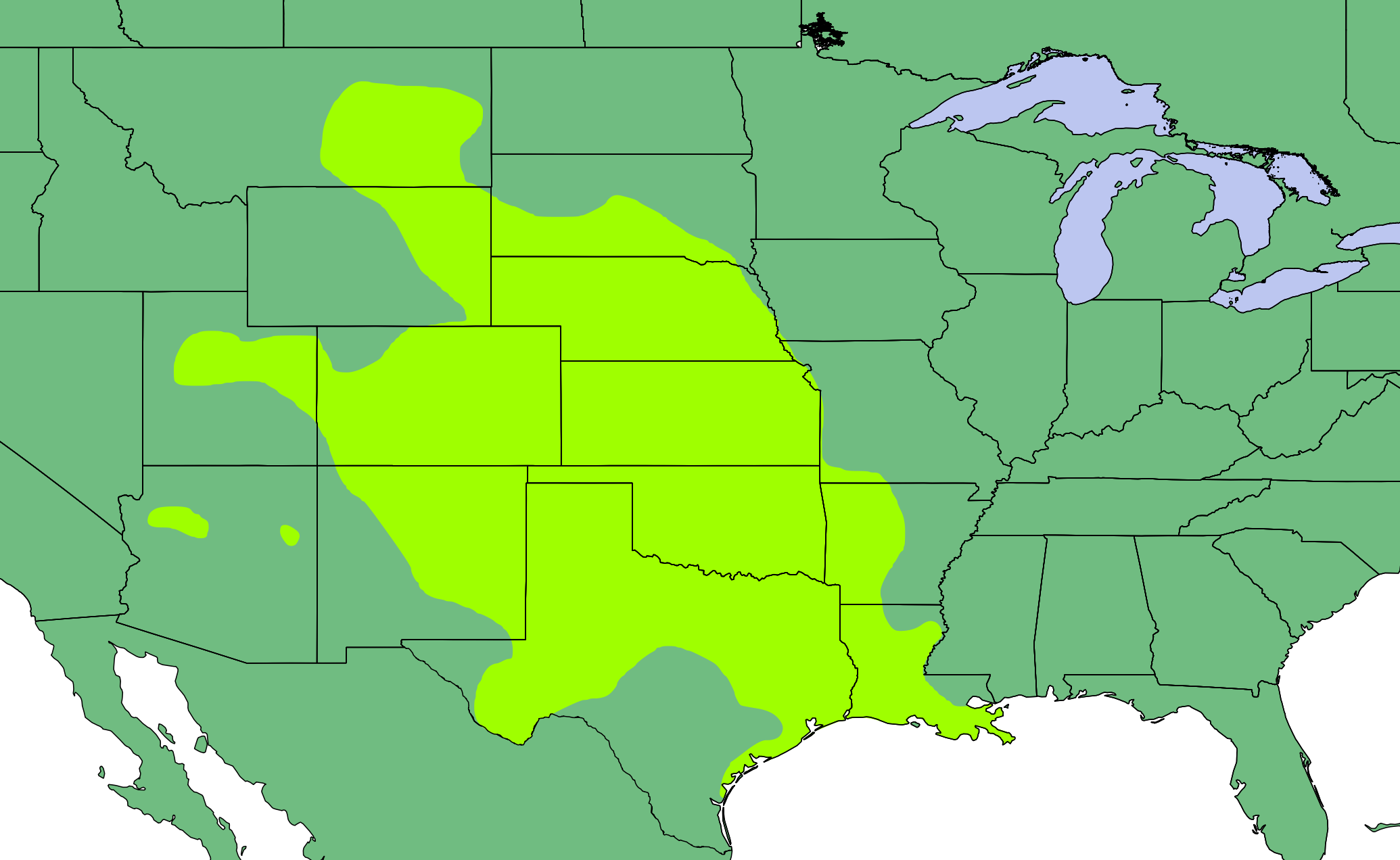

= Lampropeltis gentilis =

Species of snake

Lampropeltis gentilis, commonly known as the western milksnake, Central Plains milksnake, pale milksnake, Utah milksnake, or New Mexico milksnake, is a species of nonvenomous snake in the family Colubridae. It is found in the United States.
