= Little Theatre =

Little Theatre or Little Theater may refer to:

== Australia ==
- Little Theatre, Adelaide, South Australia
- Little Theatre, Sydney, former name of the Royal Standard Theatre, Sydney, New South Wales
- Melbourne Little Theatre, an amateur theatre company in Melbourne, Victoria (1931-1950s; later St Martin's Theatre Company)

== Canada ==
- Georgetown Little Theatre, Ontario
- Ottawa Little Theatre, Ontario

== India ==
- The Little Theatre (India), theatre group based in Chennai

== Indonesia ==
- Little Theatre (Indonesia), Jakarta

== Ireland ==
- Athlone Little Theatre

== South Africa ==
- Little Theatre (Cape Town)

== United Kingdom ==
=== England ===
- Bromley Little Theatre, London
- Little Theatre Gateshead
- Little Theatre in the Haymarket, earlier name of the Haymarket Theatre, London
- Little Theatre in the Adelphi, London (1910–1941)
- Little Theatre (Leicester)
- Sheringham Little Theatre, Norfolk

=== Scotland ===
- Mull Little Theatre, Scotland

== United States ==
- Little Theatre Movement, in America during the early 20th century

By state and city

- Phoenix Little Theatre, the original name of the Phoenix Theatre, Arizona
- Little Theater, at the UCLA School of Theater, Film and Television, Los Angeles, California
- Little Theatre, at San Diego State University, San Diego, California
- Little Theatre of Jacksonville, the original name of the NRHP-listed Theatre Jacksonville, Florida
- The Little Theatre on the Square, a theater in Sullivan, Illinois
- Marblehead Little Theatre, Massachusetts
- Little Theatre, the former name of Gem Theatre in Detroit, Michigan
- Las Vegas Little Theater, Nevada
- Albuquerque Little Theatre, New Mexico
- Lucille Ball Little Theatre, in Jamestown, New York
- Little Theatre, the original name of the Hayes Theater in New York City
- Little Theatre (Rochester, New York), NRHP-listed
- Raleigh Little Theatre, North Carolina
- Chagrin Valley Little Theatre, Chagrin Falls, Ohio
- Little Theatre of Wilkes-Barre, Pennsylvania
- Little Theatre of Alexandria, Virginia
- York Little Theatre, the original name of The Belmont Theatre in York, Pennsylvania

== See also ==
- Le Petit Théâtre (disambiguation), the French equivalent disambiguation page
- Little Theatre Guild of Great Britain
- The Little Theatre of Jean Renoir
- Maly theatre (disambiguation), Russian for The Little Theatre
