= Ruth Dodds =

Ruth Dodds (1890 – 1 April 1976) lived in Gateshead, England and was a writer, playwright and councillor of Gateshead.

Dodds was born on 8 May 1890. She was one of three daughters of bookbinder and historian Edwin Dodds and his wife Emily Dodds. Ruth Dodds lived at 'Home House' in Low Fell, Gateshead. She spent the rest of her life living there with her two sisters Hope and Sylvia.

She joined the Labour Party after the First World War and was elected to Gateshead Council in 1929. However, she failed to be selected as a Parliamentary candidate in 1931 and 1936. In 1939 she resigned from the Labour Party in protest of its support for war, and although she later rejoined she was not as politically active. She was made the first woman freeman of Gateshead in 1965.

She is known, with her sisters Hope and Sylvia, for founding the Little Theatre Gateshead. A commemorative plaque to the three sisters was erected at their Gateshead home in 2005.

== Sources ==
- Asap Live
- The National Archives
- Tyne & wear Archives catalogue of personal papers
