= Nellie Cornish =

American artist (1876–1956)

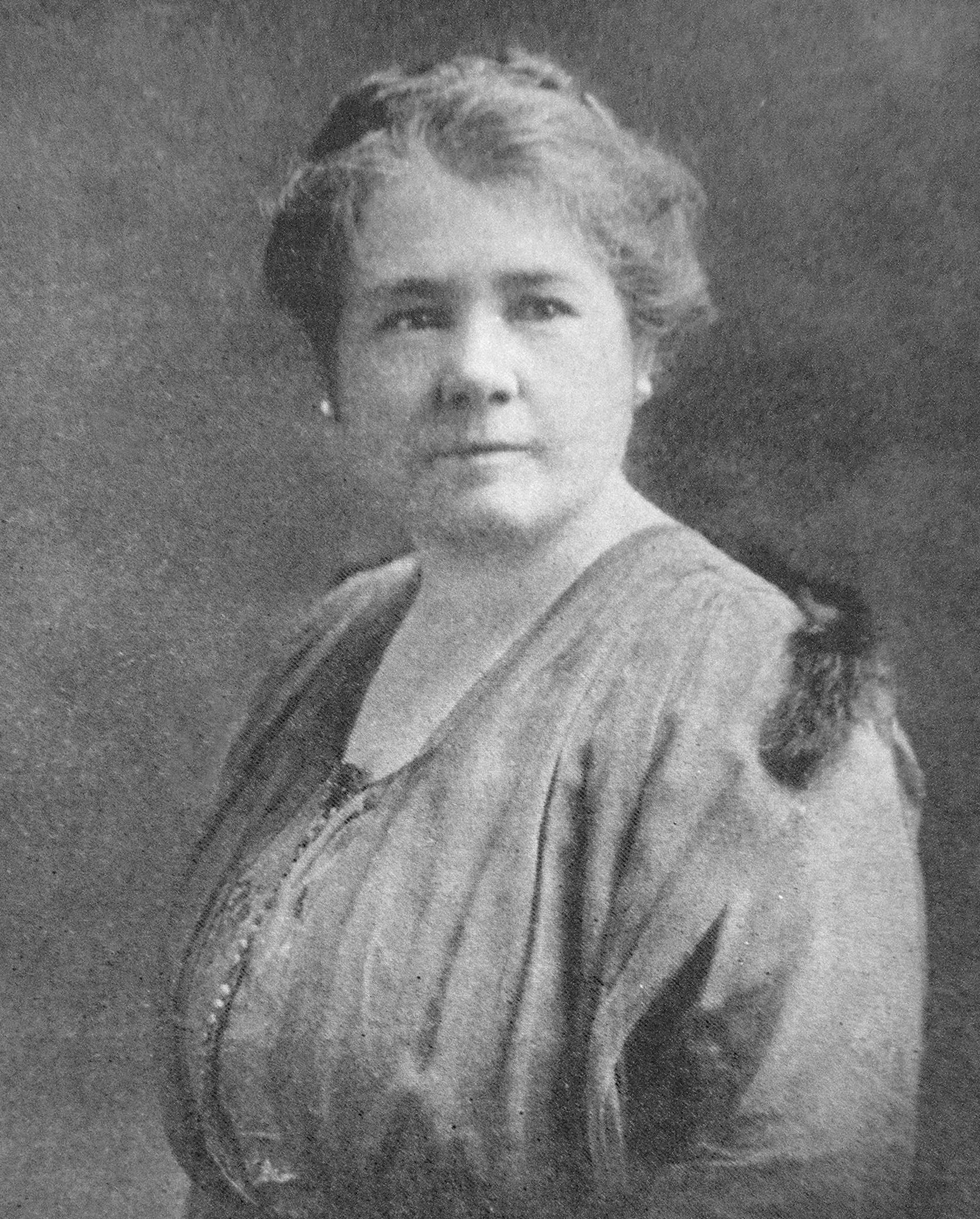
Nellie Cornish c. 1922

Nellie Centennial Cornish (1876 – 1956) was a pianist, teacher, writer, and founder of the Cornish School (now Cornish College of the Arts) in Seattle, Washington. She was influenced by the pedagogical ideas of Maria Montessori as well as Calvin Brainerd Cady's ideas about teaching broader values through music education. Martha Graham described her as "a small, round, plump little lady with the dynamism of a rocket." She founded the Cornish School in 1914 and served as the school's director for the next 25 years. Within three years it had enrolled over 600 students, and was the country's largest music school west of Chicago.

Her middle name reflects the year of her birth, the hundredth anniversary of the founding of the United States of America.

== Life and work ==
Born July 1876 in Nebraska, she grew up first in Arlington, Oregon and then in Blaine, Washington, as the daughter of the town's first mayor, lawyer Nathan Armfield Cornish. In her early teens, she lived about half a year in Portland, Oregon, where she studied piano under Ebenezer Cook, a teacher of strong local reputation. Shortly after, her father's fortunes and her mother's health began to fail. Her parents moved to Spokane, Washington, where her mother died two years later; Nellie stayed in Blaine much of that time, teaching fourth grade although still in her teens. Her father remarried to a woman she did not like, leading to a break with him. In her early twenties, she gave music lessons and did other tutoring in northwestern Oregon.

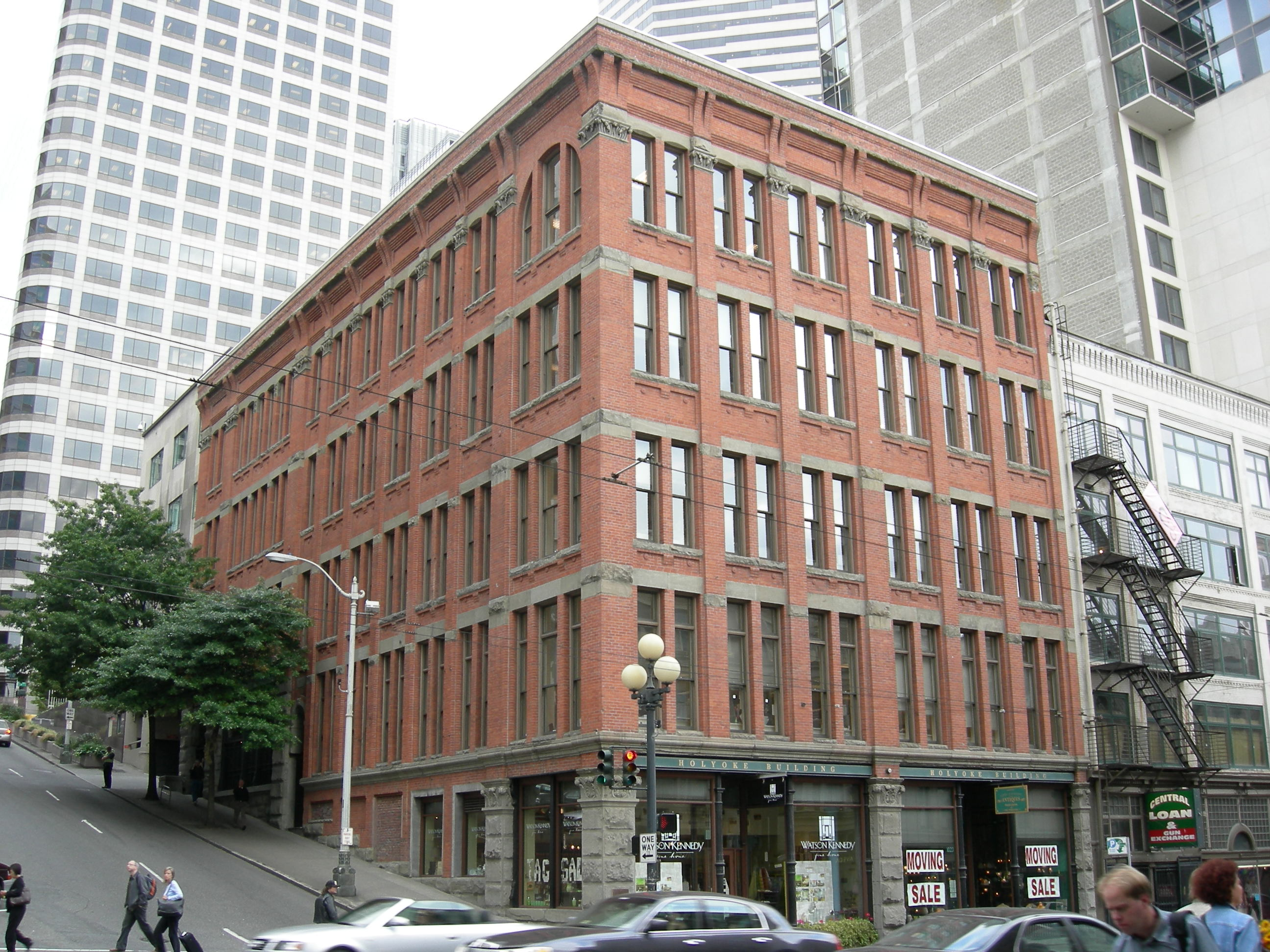
The Holyoke Building (photographed 2007)

She moved to Seattle in 1900 and took a studio in 1902 in the Holyoke Building (the center of Seattle music instruction at the time), which gave her a chance to meet nearly all of the city's leading music teachers. In 1904, she traveled to Boston for the summer to learn the Evelyn Fletcher-Copp's Montessori-influenced method of teaching piano to young children. From this, she evolved her own technique of teaching.

By 1911, when she left for Los Angeles, California to study for six weeks with Calvin Brainerd Cady, she was a very well established Seattle music teacher, with a suite of five studio rooms and two assistants. (She would later hire Cady as a faculty member at the Cornish School.) She returned to Seattle and modified her approach to teaching to incorporate Cady's ideas about using music education to impart a broader spiritual approach to life in general. However, the combination of disappointment in romance and a reconciliation with her father led her to turn over her studio to one of her assistants, Martha Sackett, and join her father in Alturas, California, where he had somewhat recovered his fortune. A plan for father and daughter to travel together to Europe was scotched by the outbreak of World War I; plans to study in New York City also fell through, as did an effort to establish herself in Salt Lake City.

She returned to Seattle, where she founded the Cornish School in 1914. In 1918, Cornish invited poet Maurice Browne and actress Ellen Van Volkenburg to found a theater department at her school. The Brownes were founders of the Chicago Little Theatre, which they closed in 1917. The department, with its incorporation of scenic design, music, and dance in its productions, became central to Cornish's plans to ally the arts. Within three years it had enrolled over 600 students, and was the country's largest music school west of Chicago. The curriculum soon expanded to include subjects as diverse as eurhythmics, French language, painting, dance (folk and ballet), and theater. She went on to serve as the school's director for the next 25 years. Mark Tobey, Martha Graham, Merce Cunningham and John Cage spent time teaching at the Cornish School during the early part of their careers.

Although she often moved among the rich and famous, Cornish did not have any particularly large sum of her own money, and was at times totally broke. Neither Cornish nor the school itself owned the custom-built 1921 building now known as Kerry Hall: the school was a tenant renting the building, which in turn was rather heavily mortgaged by the group of supporters who owned it. In 1923, the entire financial arrangement nearly came crashing down, and only some last minute donations prevented the school from having to move to Los Angeles. The next year, the realty company that owned the building converted itself into a foundation to support the school, and took on its debts. However, there was no endowment, and finances remained precarious even through what Cornish called the school's "golden years" in the mid-1920s. This remained the case even after the mortgage was paid off and the building donated to the school in 1929, and financial difficulties inevitably grew during the Great Depression. The Board neither raised an endowment nor otherwise put the school on a financial footing that would allow it to do more than "tread water." Ultimately, this led Cornish to resign her position as head of the school in 1939.

After leaving her school, Cornish spent three years of "rest and gardening" in California; spent half a year in an unsuccessful New York-based venture to improve children's radio programming; and then spent four years as head of the Pittsfield Community Music School (Pittsfield, Massachusetts). She spent her last years mainly in California, and sometimes in Seattle.

Cornish never married. According to Nancy Wilson Ross, "Twice she was deeply in love and lost the men to other women…" She adopted the orphaned Elena Miramova as her daughter.

== Other achievements ==
In 1921, Cornish led a successful fundraising drive to save the Seattle Symphony.
