= Mary Aldis =

Mary Aldis may refer to:

- Mary Aldis (playwright) (1872–1949), American playwright
- Mary Aldis (science writer) (c. 1838–1897), New Zealander science writer
