= Franc Dillon =

Beverly Hills-based journalist and publicist in the Golden Age of Hollywood

Franc Dillon (June 1890 - unknown) was a film journalist during the period of classical Hollywood cinema and the golden age of Hollywood. Dillon was a socialite, clubwoman, and friend of actor Harold Lloyd and his wife Mildred Davis Lloyd, helping them launch the Beverly Hills Little Theatre for Professionals that was part of a national little theatre movement. It became an important showcase for young actors hoping to be discovered, and for New York stage veterans who wanted to be seen in Hollywood. As a publicist and advertising executive, she negotiated with film production companies to guarantee some of the earliest product placements in films.

== Early life ==
She was born Franc (possibly Frances) Newman in June, 1890, in Michigan, the daughter of Florence Ada Grousbeck (1863-1951) and Frank W. "F. W." Newman (1859–1890). Some sources give her maiden name as Franc Tait, the surname of her mother's second husband, William Walter Tait (1870-1934). Franc may have lowered her age by four or five years when she moved to Los Angeles, because the 1930 census shows a claimed birth date of 1895 rather than 1890. Her marriage license says she was born in 1891, but that year is not possible if she was the blood daughter of F. W. Newman, who died in 1890. She had a brother, Houk Erbine Newman, and three half siblings, Florence Eleanor Tait, John David Tait, and William Walter Tait Jr.

== Journalism ==
She published regular features in a dozen of the leading movie magazines of the day, including Photoplay, Modern Screen, and Picture Play. She was often in the society pages, for example in the Los Angeles Times as a frequent name in Myra Nye's "Society of Cinemaland" column, or the page "Of Interest to Women." Dillon's decision to write about a new talent and how to showcase that person could have an effect on how they were received. She was also a correspondent for newspapers across the country promoting Hollywood to the masses, for example publishing a two-page spread in what was then known as the Atlanta Constitution showing movie stars like Al Jolson, Ann Dvorak, and Joel McCrea engaging in farm work to show that they could relate to everyday people. From 1928 to 1935 she was also a Hollywood correspondent and columnist for the Brooklyn Standard-Union, later the Times-Union. In 1949 she was named the editor of Western Family, a women's magazine, but by 1957 her name had dropped off of the masthead.

== Publicity profession ==
The publicity field, along with society and gossip columns, gave women a measure of power and control in a town more conventionally run by men. With screenwriter Katherine Albert of MGM and others she led the Women's Association of Screen Publicists (WASPs), a group that formed in October 1924. In 1928 Dillon was listed in The Film Spectator as working for the Charles S. Dunning publicity firm. Sometimes she hosted events that might now be called publicity stunts, such as having a 1928 peanut-shelling party at her home where the WASPs worked their way through 300 pounds of them to benefit charity. Later, in the late 1930s and 1940s she worked for the J. Walter Thompson advertising company as part of a noted all-woman team headed by Maxine Smith.

== Clubwoman ==
Women in Hollywood also formed clubs which gave them collective strength. One of Dillon's earliest clubs was a branch of the Soroptimists, formed in 1922 when the international organization was just a year old. In 1927 she was listed in Film Year Book as vice president of the WASPs, with Elizabeth Riordan as president. She was founding president of the Screen Women's Press Club (SWPC), beginning in 1930. They often met in the Munchers Club, a café on the Fox movie studio lot. SWPC should not be confused with the Hollywood Women's Press Club founded in 1928 by Louella Parsons and Myra Nye, although the groups overlapped and were sometimes considered functionally the same. She was also chair of the Publicity Club, which met at the Nickodell on Argyle, a famous old Hollywood restaurant.

== Personal life ==
On October 24, 1914 she married silent film actor Edward Dillon, known as Mary Pickford's first leading man, who also directed for D. W. Griffith for nine years. Actor John T. Dillon was her brother-in-law. It is unknown when the marriage ended, but in the 1930 census Franc Dillon is listed as divorced at age 35, with her mother living in her home. Edward Dillon died of a sudden heart attack in 1933, and news reports said she went to his funeral. In the 1940 census she is listed as widowed rather than divorced.

She was quite small in stature, for The Clubwoman yearbook of 1928 described a style show, with many women in costume, where "Little Franc Dillon in bell hop attire was flying about seating folk." Similarly, society columnist Lucille Leimert called her a "pint-sized Hollywood career girl."

In 1931 she showed a one-year-old white, black, and tan wire fox terrier with the show name Sidlaw Bandit Queen.

Her date of death is not yet known. The most recent reference for her is in the Los Angeles Times, 15 June 1954, when she would have been 60.

== Partial list of feature articles (in progress) ==
Year	Publication	Title	Notes
1925	Not listed	Tom Mix's Fight for Thomasina	Tom Mix
1932-03	Photoplay	A Gallant Mother	Mae Marsh
1932-09	Movie Classic	Is Marlene Dietrich Being Frightened Away from America?	Marlene Dietrich
1932-09	Motion Picture	Harold Lloyd's Wife--The World's Champion Housekeeper	Mildred Davis Lloyd
1932-10	Modern Screen	Watching Out For the Babies	Dorothy Jordan, Loretta Young, etc.
1932-11	Modern Screen	Exposing Andy Clyde	Andy Clyde
1933-04	New Movie	Intimate Facts About Marlene's Wardrobe	Marlene Dietrich
1934-01	New Movie	Youth Looks Ahead	Loretta Young
1934-01	New Movie	Advance News of New Films in the Making	Elizabeth Young, et al
1934-05	Motion Picture	Hollywood is Ruining Me As an Actress	Gloria Stuart
1934-06	Movie Mirror	Marion Davies: Angel of Mercy	Marion Davies
1934-10	Movie Classic	George Brent Is On His Own Now, and Likes It!	George Brent
1934-11	Movie Classic	Hollywood's Big Surprise	Ketti Gallian
1935-02	Screenland	George Brent's Future	George Brent
1935-02	Picture Play	Gay Spender No More	Reginald Denny
1935-02	Motion Picture	A Miracle is Filmed	Robert E. Cornish
1935-02	Modern Screen	I Chaperone the Crowd	Hollywood's younger set
1935-03	Picture Play	Who Is This Man?	Samuel Hinds
1935-05	Picture Play	A Wife the Sun Shines On	Verree Teasdale
1935-07	Picture Play	The Sweetest Story Ever Told	Wedding of chorus girl and boy
1935-07	Modern Screen	How Are Joel and Frances Getting Along?	Joel McCrea and Frances Dee
1935-09	Modern Screen	How Can You Help Liking Her?	Edna May Oliver
1935-10	Modern Screen	Star Worrier	Bette Davis
1935-11	Picture Play	Dashing Adventurer	Ray Milland
1935-12	Picture Play	Destiny Beckoned, She Followed	Olivia de Havilland
1935-12	Modern Screen	Shirley Temple. Saver of Lives.	Shirley Temple
1936-01	Modern Screen	Little Man, What Next?	Freddie Bartholemew
1936-02	Modern Screen	Tom's Rules for Sidestepping Trouble	Tom Brown
1936-03	Modern Screen	He's a Travellin' Man	George O'Brien
1936-05	Modern Screen	Sentimental Roughneck	George Raft
1936-07	Modern Screen	Not Subject to Change	Luise Rainer
1936-08	Modern Screen	Tumbling to the Top	Joe E. Brown
1936-09	Modern Screen	On the Set With Romeo and Juliet	Norma Shearer and Leslie Howard
1936-10	Modern Screen	Her Guiding Stars	Merle Oberon
1936-10	Radio Stars	At Home With One Man's Family	One Man's Family (radio show)
1936-12	Screenland	Black Sheep Stander	Lionel Stander
1936-12	Modern Screen	Freedom's a Flop!	Tom Brown
1936-12	Radio Stars	He's Got Plenty of Umphhh!	Smith Ballew
1937-02	Modern Screen	When He's Wrong, He's Right!	Melvyn Douglas
1937-05	Radio Stars	Francia of the Rancho	Francia White
1937-07	Modern Screen	Highlighting Gene	Gene Raymond
1937-09	Modern Screen	She's Taking it Easy	Claudette Colbert
1937-10	Modern Screen	Public Cowboy No. 1	Gene Autrey
1938-03	Picture Play	He Didn't Wait for Luck	Patric Knowles
1938-03	Modern Screen	It's Fun to be Broke!	Beverly Roberts
1938-04	Modern Screen	Bob Speaks Up	Robert Kent
1938-05	Modern Screen	That Thing Called Temperament	Herbert Marshall
1938-09	Modern Screen	She's Not Afraid	Gloria Dickson
1939-02	Hollywood	Women Worry Men (as explained by George Brent)	George Brent
1939-06	Hollywood	Being Broke Helps	Dennis O'Keefe
1939-09	Hollywood	Cagney Changes His Mind	James Cagney
1940-08	Motion Picture	Still Pulling Them In	Jeffrey Lynn
1941-04	Screen Life	Trouble at Home	Mary Martin
