= Little Theatre Movement =

US experimental centers for dramatic arts

The Little Theatre Movement developed in the United States around 1912 as the new medium of cinema was beginning to replace live theater as a source of large-scale spectacle. The Little Theatre Movement served to provide experimental centers for the dramatic arts, free from the standard production mechanisms used in prominent commercial theaters. In several large cities, beginning with Chicago, Boston, Seattle, and Detroit, companies formed to produce more intimate, non-commercial, non-profit-centered, and reform-minded entertainments.

== History ==
=== Conventional theater in 19th-century America ===
Sensational melodramas had entertained theatre audiences since the mid-19th century, drawing larger and larger audiences. These types of formulaic works could be produced over and over again in splendid halls in big cities and by touring companies in smaller ones. During the last decades of the century, producers and playwrights began to create narratives dealing with social problems, albeit usually on a sensational level. While not yet totally free of melodramatic elements, plays reflecting a style more associated with realism gradually emerged. During a secret meeting in 1895, the owners of most of the theatres across America organized into a Theatrical Syndicate "to control competition and prices." This group, which included all major producers, "effectively stifled dramatic experimentation for many years" in search of greater profits. By the second decade of the 20th century, pure melodrama, with its typed characters and exaggerated plots, had become the province of motion pictures.

=== Little Theaters of Chicago ===
Chicago's philanthropists and arts patrons Arthur T. and Mary Aldis established an artists' colony called The Compound in Lake Forest, Illinois In 1910, Mary founded there the Aldis Playhouse, "a predecessor to the 'little theater' movement". The Hull House settlement theatre group, founded by Jane Addams and Ellen Gates Starr, was the first to perform several plays by Galsworthy, Ibsen, and Shaw in Chicago. Maurice Browne, director and co-founder of the Chicago Little Theatre with Ellen Van Volkenburg, responding to having often been called the founder of the Little Theatre Movement, instead credited Hull House director Laura Dainty Pelham with being the "true founder of the 'American Little Theatre Movement'". Nevertheless, Browne and Van Volkenburg's company had, as the first little theatre to use the term, provided the movement with its name and inspired the creation in 1914 of Margaret Anderson's influential Chicago periodical The Little Review.

Alice Gerstenberg, an original member of the Chicago Little Theatre, expanded the movement to include children, founding the Chicago Junior League Theatre for Children in 1921. Gerstenberg was also producer and president of The Playwrights' Theatre of Chicago, 1922–1945. She was active in the Alice Gerstenberg Experimental Theatre Workshop in the 1950s and the Alice Gerstenberg Theatre in the 1960s, which helped to cultivate the legacy of the Little Theatre Movement of the early 20th century.

In 1912, two theatre groups were formed, the Toy Theatre in Boston and the Chicago Little Theatre; these events often being cited as the official start of the Little Theatre Movement in the United States. Continuing to react against commercialism, amateur companies began to write and produce their own works as well as new plays from Europe that had been ignored by the syndicates. A wide variety of experimental groups, clubs, and settlement houses undertook to reform the theater, bringing more inwardly directed plays to a wider public audience. New forms of drama, some influenced by or parodying the new science of psychoanalysis, began to be presented in smaller venues, many converted from other uses into makeshift theatres. The new groups began to experiment with new forms of storytelling, acting styles, dialogue, and mise-en-scene. This experimentation, influenced by European models, ranged from an ultra-detailed naturalism to, by the early 1920s, a wildly provocative expressionism, part of a new stagecraft. Women were pervasive throughout these companies, although their efforts were often belittled, dismissed, or undervalued. Several theaters also sprang up during this period. The Wee Playhouse reading theater in Alfred, New York, traces its origin to Fall 1920 and still holds meetings today, making it probably the oldest continuous reading theater in the country.

=== Pasadena Community Playhouse ===
The movement achieved high-water marks in artistic significance, community involvement, and international recognition with the Pasadena Community Playhouse. Originally a community theatre, the Playhouse boasted at its peak capacity six stages, each featuring a new production every two weeks, making it, for most of the early 20th century, the world's most prolific theatrical production organization. This palatial venue was, at the time of its construction in 1925, the largest theatre complex west of Chicago. The organization was able to complete many projects beyond the scope of professional companies because of volunteer labor, widespread community support and the directorship of Gilmor Brown. Notable undertakings of the Pasadena Playhouse include the staging of the entire canon of Shakespeare for the first time on a single stage and a Midsummer Drama Festival showcasing the work of local writers. In 1928, the Playhouse produced the massive theo-philosophical epic Lazarus Laughed by Eugene O'Neill. The first fully realized production of this play, the cast included 250 primarily local amateur actors, often doubling in roles that required more than three hundred masks and costumes.

=== Beverly Hills Little Theatre for Professionals ===
Actor Harold Lloyd and others founded the Beverly Hills Little Theatre for Professionals in 1931. It was originally housed at the Wilkes Vine Street Theatre, and by 1938 had moved to Santa Monica boulevard. This 400-seat theater bore the names of the founder-subscribers on the seat backs. A piece in Variety noted that Lloyd's mother, Sarah Elisabeth Fraser, along with Gladys Lloyd Cassell (wife of Edward G. Robinson), and their friend Sam Hardy raised funds for it. Even before it opened there were rumors in Hollywood that something from the little theatre movement was on its way. Cal York (a Photoplay gossip column pseudonym for an amalgam of California and New York), overheard Franc Dillon ask Kenneth Harlan to be in one of the future plays. They were all at Estelle Taylor's estate when this conversation occurred, and from the beginning it attracted a film industry crowd. It served as a showcase for young talent, as a place for stars of the silent era to demonstrate their voices for talking pictures, and as an elegant way to transition from stage to film by being seen by Hollywood talent scouts. MGM dramatic coach Oliver Hinsdell was a frequent director there in the early years.

=== Little theaters in the 1920s and 1930s ===
The Little Theatre Movement began in the early 20th century and was a result of young theatre practitioners, dramaturges, stage technicians, stage designers, and actors, who were influenced by European Theatre. More specifically, they were interested in the ideas of Max Reinhardt, a German director, the designing techniques of Adolphe Appia and Gordon Craig, and the staging methods at the Théâtre Libre in Paris, the Freie Bühne in Berlin, and the Moscow Art Theatre.

Seeking larger audiences and with more complicated production ambitions, by the early 1920s, several leading companies of the movement had turned professional. The Provincetown Players, who produced O'Neill's first one-acts, moved to New York in 1916; members of the former Washington Square Players formed the Theatre Guild in 1919; but in its heyday, dozens of Little Theatre groups presented alternatives to mainstream commercial theatre. Numerous small companies had flourished, creating environments for diverse voices and viewpoints.

The Provincetown Players brought the first important playwright, O'Neill, to fruition. The Provincetown Players were founded in 1915, by three people: Neith Boyce, George Cram Cook, and Susan Glaspell, who undertook Realism, an eccentric form of theatre at the time. O'Neill joined the Provincetown Players in 1916; they performed his first play Bound East for Cardiff that year. After moving to New York, they formed the Provincetown Playhouse, which is still in operation.

Other new little theaters started as community theater groups and university drama programs in the United States and Canada. Theatre Arts Monthly magazine dedicated its July issue from 1924 through the 1930s and beyond to "tributary theatres", its name for little theater programs purportedly serving as tributaries for Broadway, London's West End, and other centers of professional theater. In 1924, Browne and Volkenburg started the Summer School of the Art of the Theatre at the Theatre of the Golden Bough in Carmel-by-the-Sea, California. In 1932, Burns Mantle of the Chicago Tribune listed the following non-professional and semi-professional theater companies that were interested in staging new plays: Gilmour Brown's Pasadena Playhouse, Garrett Leverton's Northwestern University group, Syracuse University, the Little Theatre of St. Louis, Frederic McConnell's Playhouse in Cleveland, Western Reserve University, Duluth Little Theater, Dartmouth College's Laboratory Theatre, University of Iowa (under the direction of Prof. E. C. Mabie), University of Minnesota, Little Theater of Birmingham, University of Denver (under the direction of Walter Sinclair), Little Theater of Akron, Ohio, Little Theater of El Paso, University of Nebraska, Jasper Deeter's Hedgerow Theater at Moylan Rose Valley in Pennsylvania, the Parrish Players of Stony Creek, Connecticut, and the Little Theater of Dallas, Texas. The Washington, DC-area Little Theatre of Alexandria was founded in 1935 at the height of the movement, and is still active, as is the University of Northern Colorado's Little Theatre of the Rockies, founded by Helen Langworthy in 1934.

Comparable theatres were also established in Canada around the same time: the Arts and Letters Club of Toronto (1908), the Ottawa Little Theatre (1913), the Hart House Theatre at the University of Toronto (1919), and the Play Workshop (1934) are all notable examples. As in the United States, many of the playwrights who got their start in these theatres—including Herman Voaden, Merrill Denison, and W.A. Tremayne—went on to anchor early professional theatres.

The July 1939 issue of Theatre Arts Monthly listed the following companies in its "National Little Theatre Directory":

State/Territory	Company	School	City	Director
Alabama	The Auburn Players	Alabama Polytechnic Institute		Telfair B. Peet
	The College Theater	Alabama College, Montevallo		Walter H. Trumbauer
Arizona	Dept. of Dramatic Arts	University of Arizona		Gordon Davis
California	Placer Junior College Drama Guild		Auburn, California	Lillian B. Allen
	Padua Hills Theatre		Claremont, CA	Charles A. Dickinson
	University Dramatics Society	University of California at Los Angeles		Marvin Brody
	Department of Drama	Mills College		Marian Long Stebbins, L. Louise Stephens, and Evaline Uhl Wright
	Pacific Little Theatre	College of the Pacific		DeMarcus Brown
Canal Zone	Balboa Little Theatre			Subert Turbyfill
Colorado	University Civic Theatre	University of Denver		Walter Sinclair
	Perry-Mansfield		Steamboat Springs, CO	Charlotte Perry
Illinois	Goodman Memorial Theater	Art Institute of Chicago		Maurice Gnesin
	Mundelein College for Women		Chicago, Illinois	Anne Larkin
	Northwestern University Theatre		Evanston, IL	
	Drama Department	Rosary College	River Forest, IL	
Indiana	The Players Club	Saint Mary-of-the-Woods College		Charlotte Lee
	The Sycamore Players	Indiana State Teachers College	Terre Haute, IN	R. W. Masters
Iowa	Department of Drama	Grinnell College	Grinnell, IA	Sara Sherman Pryor
Kansas	Fort Hays Kansas State College Little Theatre			Orvis Grout
Kentucky	Guignol Theatre	University of Kentucky		Frank Fowler
Louisiana	Tulane University Theatre		New Orleans, LA	Monroe Lippman
Maine	The Maine Masque	University of Maine	Orono, ME	Herschel L. Bricker
Massachusetts	Theatre Workshop	Emerson College	Boston, MA	Gertrude Binley Kay, Grover Shaw, Allee Hamilton
	Erskine Drama Department		Boston, MA	Phyllis Stohl
	Gloucester School of the Theatre		Gloucester, MA	Florence Cunningham
	Theatre Workshop	Wellesley College	Wellesley, MA	Edith Margaret Smaill
Michigan	The Michigan Repertory Players	University of Michigan	Ann Arbor, MI	Valentine B. Windt
	Graveraet Dramatic Club		Marquette, MI	W. M. Whitman
Minnesota	University of Minnesota Theatre		Minneapolis, MN	C. Lowell Lees
Missouri	Missouri Workshop	University of Missouri	Columbia, MO	Donovan Rhynsburger
	Stephens College Players		Columbia, MO	A. Laurence Mortensen
Nebraska	Omaha Community Playhouse			Gordon Giffen
New Hampshire	Dartmouth Players		Hanover, NH	Warney Bentley
	New London Players of New Hampshire		New London, NH	Josephine E. Holmes, Dorothy A. Claverie
New York		Sarah Lawrence College	Bronxville, NY	Mary Virginia Heinlein
	Cornell University Theatre and Summer Theatre		Ithaca, NY	A. M. Dummond
	The Little Theatre of Jamestown		Jamestown, NY	George & Harriet Warren
	The Rochester Community Players		Rochester, NY	Robert Stevens
	Civic University Theatre Dramatic Activities	Syracuse University		Sawyer Falk
North Carolina	The Carolina Playmakers		Chapel Hill, NC	Frederick H. Koch
	The Greensboro College Players		Greensboro, NC	Elba Henninger
Ohio	Cain Park Municipal Theatre		Cleveland Heights, OH	Dina Rees Evans
	Players Club		Columbus, OH	Stokes McCune
	The Wesleyan Players	Ohio Wesleyan University	Delaware, OH	R. C. Hunter, Hortense Moore
	Peabody Players	Western College	Oxford, OH	Helen Hasley
	University Theatre	University of Toledo		Morlin Bell
	Antioch Players		Yellow Springs, OH	Paul F. Treichler
	The Youngstown Players		Youngstown, OH	Theodore Viehman
Oregon	The University Theatre	University of Oregon	Eugene, OR	Ottilie Turnbull Seybolt
	The Portland Civic Theatre		Portland, OR	Donald Marye
Pennsylvania	Department of Dramatic Art	Allegheny College	Meadville, PA	Alice H. Spalding
	The Green Room Theater	Franklin and Marshall College	Lancaster, PA	Darrell Larsen
	Pittsburgh Playhouse		Pittsburgh, PA	Frederick Burleigh
	The Penn State Players		State College, PA	Arthur C. Cloetingh
	York Little Theatre		York, PA	
South Carolina	The Palmetto Players	Converse College	Spartanburg, SC	Hazel Abbott
Tennessee	Classic Players	Bob Jones College	Cleveland, TN	Bob Jones Jr.
Texas	The Curtain Club	The University of Texas	Austin, TX	James H. Parke
	Houston Little Theater		Houston, TX	Frederick Leon Webster
Utah	The Playbox		Salt Lake City, UT	Robert Hyde Wilson
Vermont	The Bennington Theatre Studio		Bennington, VT	Francis Fergusson
Virginia	The William and Mary Theatre	College of William and Mary	Williamsburg, VA	Althea Hunt
West Virginia	West Virginia University Players		Morgantown, WV	James B. Lowther
Wisconsin	Lawrence College		Appleton, WI	F. Theodore Clark

=== Contemporary effects of the Little Theatre Movement ===
Little Theatre can be seen as a precursor to the Off-Broadway movement of the 1950s as well as to other smaller, non-commercial ventures thereafter. Today's community theater may be also seen as an outgrowth of the Little Theatre Movement.

== Playwrights ==
The little theatre movement featured works by emerging various writers selected for their artistic skills. These venues provided performance opportunities for playwrights including Eugene O'Neill, George S. Kaufman, Elmer Rice, Maxwell Anderson and Robert E. Sherwood.

== Film ==
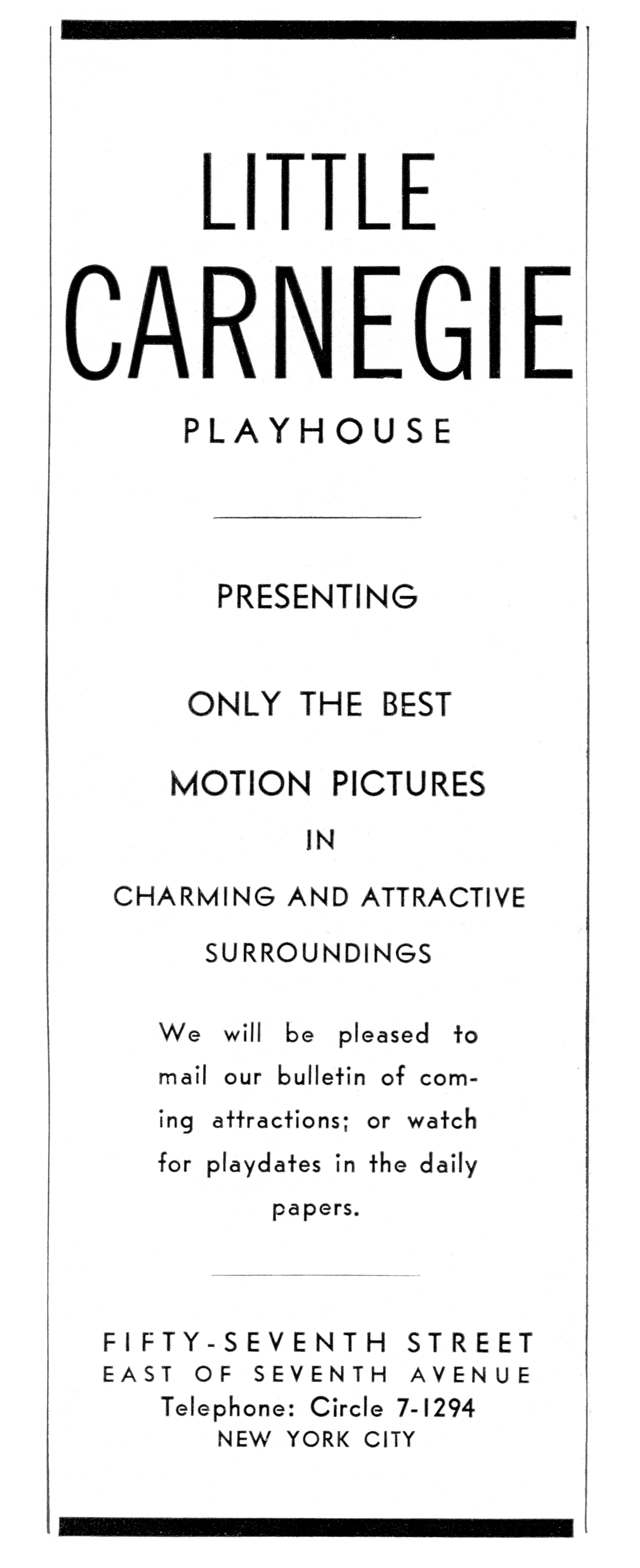
An art house cinema designed by Wolfgang and Pola Hoffmann, the Little Carnegie Playhouse in New York City was an austere exemplar of American modernism that opened in 1928 with the U.S. premiere of Sergei Eisenstein's Ten Days That Shook the World.

The 1920s was one of the most critical periods in the United States for the showing of foreign films. Films from several European countries were exhibited throughout the U.S. Before World War I, many European films were shown in the United States. However, the 1920s was crucial because European films laid down the foundation for the American independent film culture, also known as the Little Theatre Movement.

Several people disliked the American film industry for moral or social dilemmas. The Little Theatre Movement served to oppose Hollywood and the film industry; they dismissed Hollywood's mass production and creation of films to appeal to the largest possible audience.

The Little Theatre Movement's focus was on creating fine art, focused not on commercial purposes, but rather, on artistic, historical, or political content. European films were screened often since there were not a lot of alternatives to major Hollywood productions. These theaters appealed to the upper class and radicals who were isolated from Hollywood. Audience members were encouraged to discuss the films after they were shown.

There was an outstanding increase in Little Theatres that specifically screened European films from 1926 to 1929. The films were believed to be of "perceived artistic superiority to Hollywood Films," which coined the concept of the European Art Film. Eventually, the term "art film" became very loose and society started seeing any film not produced in Hollywood as "art".

The way the term "art film" was used in the United States led to more critical thinking on film. The Little Theatre Movement gave birth to the Golden Age of the International Art Film (1950-1960s), when directors like Ingmar Bergman, Jean-Luc Godard, and Michelangelo Antonioni became popular in the United States.

== See also ==
- Le Petit Théâtre (disambiguation)
- Little Theatre Guild of Great Britain
- Ainslie Pryor
- Off-Broadway
- Negro Little Theatre Movement

== Sources ==
- Bryer, Jackson R., ed. (1982). The Theatre We Worked For: The Letters of Eugene O'Neill to Kenneth Macgowan. Yale University Press. doi:10.2307/j.ctt1xp3t9c. ISBN 978-0-300-02583-5. JSTOR j.ctt1xp3t9c. OCLC 1019750544.
- Watt, Stephen; Richardson, Gary A. (2003). American Drama: Colonial to Contemporary. Cengage Learning. ISBN 978-1-4130-9631-6. OCLC 1319189888.
