= Mary Aldis (playwright) =

American playwright, poet, little theater founder

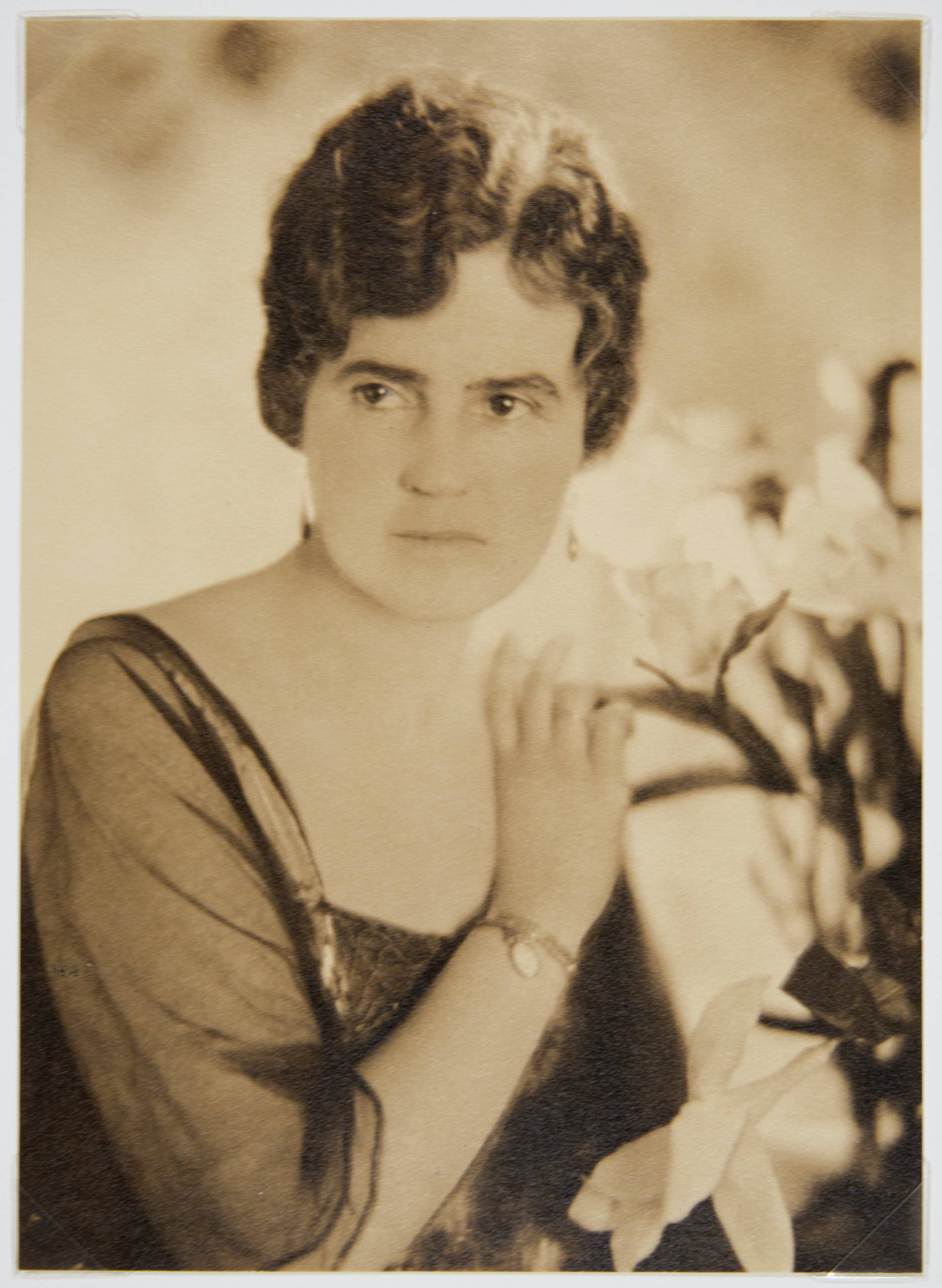
- Born: Mary Reynolds Aldis; June 8, 1872; Chicago
- Died: June 20, 1949 (aged 77)
- Known for: Aldis Playhouse

Mary Reynolds Aldis (1872–1949) was an American playwright and figure in the little theater movement who founded a small theater outside Chicago in the early 1910s.

== Life and career ==
Mary Reynolds was born in 1872 in Chicago, Illinois. Her birth year is contested, with one source listing 1869. She attended St. Mary's School in Knoxville, Illinois. In 1892, she married Arthur Taylor Aldis, a Chicago lawyer and real estate investor, and together settled in Lake Forest, Illinois, a wealthy area north of Chicago. They became known as patrons of the arts and for their relationships with area writers such as Edgar Lee Masters.

Aldis was a prominent figure in the second wave of the Chicago Renaissance, a literary period between 1910 and the mid-1920s. Their Lake Forest residence became known as an artists' colony, where she converted a guest house into a small, 90-seat theater near her home. Between 1910 and 1915, the Aldis Playhouse's Lake Forest Players hosted amateur works by Aldis and others. They were reviewed as having "simple, truthful acting" and performed in Boston's Toy Theatre. Aldis participated in the Chicago Players' Workshop, which presented Chicago playwrights. The Players also adapted from European one-acts and short stories for invited audiences. Aldis published a collection of her plays, Plays for Small Stages, in 1915. Among those that Aldis wrote, produced, and performed, the 1915 Mrs. Pat and the Law is best known. These productions were contemporary with the Chicago Little Theatre. Aldis hosted plays by Lady Gregory, William Butler Yeats, John Millington Synge, and arranged for Augusta, Lady Gregory, of the Irish Abbey Theatre to perform in Chicago.

She was also involved in poetry. At Lake Forest, Aldis hosted Harriet Monroe of Poetry. Aldis's own poetry appeared in that magazine, Alfred Kreymborg's Others: A Magazine of the New Verse, and anthologies by Others and Monroe's The New Poetry. Aldis published her first poetry collection, Flashlights, in 1916. She was a member of the Society of Midland Authors, multiple women's groups, and led an area visiting nurses association. Aldis died on June 20, 1949.

== Works ==
Plays

- Plays for Small Stages (1915)
  - Mrs. Pat and the Law
  - The Drama Class
  - Extreme Unction
  - Temperament
- Mrs. Pat and the Law: A Play in One Act (1923)
- An Heir at Large: A Play in Seven Scenes (1926)

Fiction

- The Princess Jack (1915)
- Drift (1918)

Poetry

- Flashlights (1916)
