= Ellen Van Volkenburg =

American actress (1882–1978)

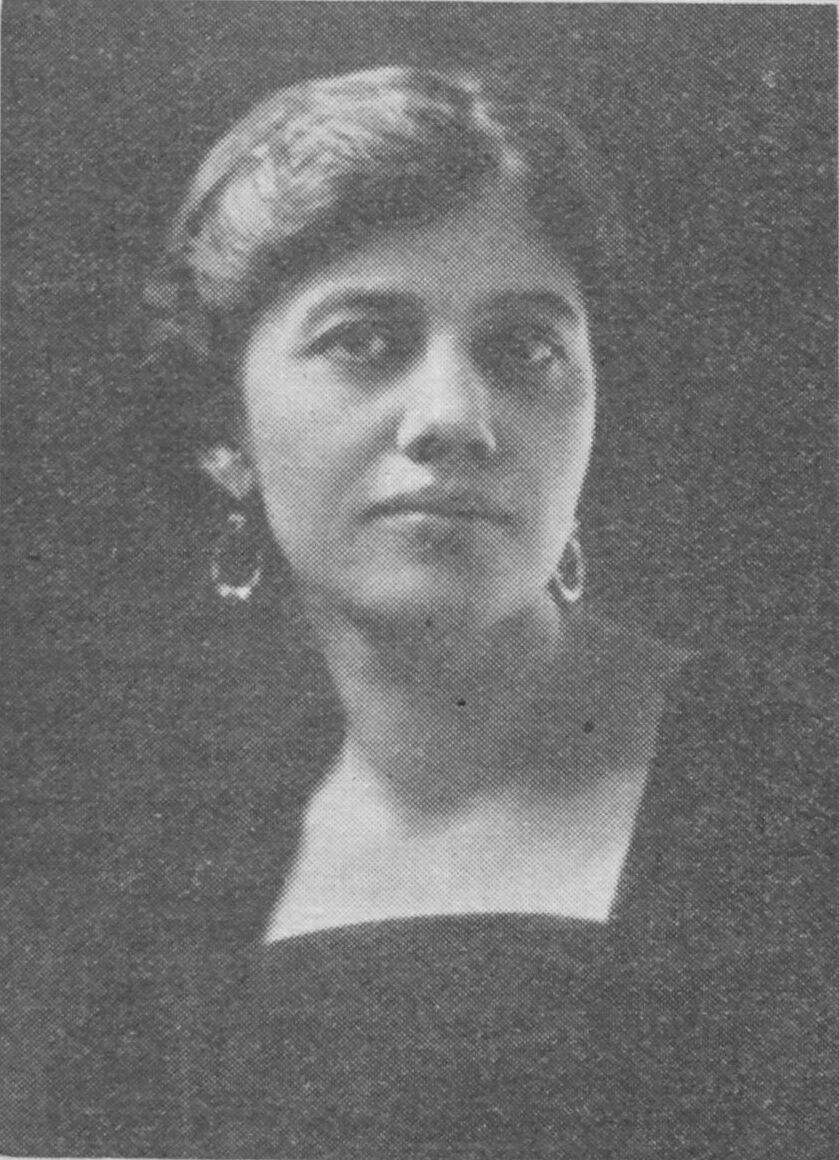
- Ellen Van Volkenburg, circa 1918
- Born: Nellie Louise Van Volkenburg; October 8, 1882; Battle Creek, Michigan, US
- Died: December 15, 1978 (aged 96); Los Angeles, California, U.S.
- Occupations: Actress, director, producer, puppeteer
- Spouse: Maurice Browne

Ellen Van Volkenburg Browne (October 8, 1882 – December 15, 1978), born Nellie Louise Van Volkenburg, was an American actress, director, puppeteer and theater educator. She was associated with the Little Theatre Movement, and with Cornish College of the Arts.

== Early life ==
Van Volkenburg was born in Battle Creek, Michigan, the daughter of Frank Hoyt Van Volkenburg and Juliet Cooper Van Volkenburg. She attended high school in Fort Wayne, Indiana, and graduated from the University of Michigan. Her prodigious memory was studied by psychologists when she was a young woman.

== Career ==
Van Volkenburg has been credited, along with Englishman Maurice Browne, with being a founder of the Little Theatre Movement in America, after they started the Chicago Little Theatre in 1912.

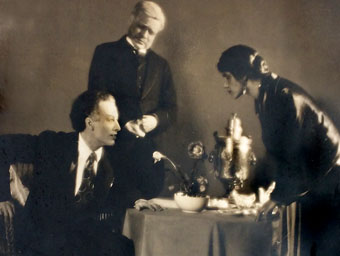
Chicago Little Theatre, c.1912

Van Volkenburg and Browne founded the department of drama at the Cornish School in Seattle in 1918, now Cornish College of the Arts. Van Volkenburg starred in Medea, directed by Browne in New York in 1920. "Her reading was dominated by intelligence rather than by poetic reading or deep emotional appeal, while her action was plastic and expressive," wrote one reviewer. In 1921, Browne and Volkenburg acted in the performance of George Bernard Shaw's The Philanderer at the Cornish School playhouse.

In January 1924, Van Volkenburg gave a puppet performance of A Midsummer Night's Dream in San Francisco, with puppets designed by sculptor Kathleen Wheeler. At the opening night of the Theatre of the Golden Bough in Carmel, Volkenburg had the title role in Maurice Browne's play, The Mother of Gregory, which played June 6, 7, and 14, 1924. In 1930, she produced Othello in London, with Paul Robeson in the title role, Browne as Iago, and Peggy Ashcroft as Desdemona.

The Cornish Players honored Van Volkenburg at their opening night in 1933. In 1938, Van Volkenburg was the inaugural guest director at the University of British Columbia's summer theatre school. In 1947 she directed a Chicago production of a new play by Dorothy Gardner, Eastward in Eden, starring Beatrice Straight as Emily Dickinson. She co-edited Miss Aunt Nellie (1965), the autobiography of Nellie Cornish, with Edward Nordhoff Beck.

== Personal life and legacy ==
Nellie Cornish described Van Volkenburg's appearance: "She looked Italian. She wore a big Italian cape and a large black beaver hat. Dangling from her ears were almost life-size swallows made from silver and studded with turquoise. Her black cape wa fastened at the throat by a large brooch, also silver and turquoise."

Van Volkenburg married Maurice Browne in 1912, in Chicago. Though they divorced in 1922, they continued to work together, and for much of her life she signed herself "Ellen Van Volkenburg Browne." Van Volkenburg died on December 15, 1978, in Los Angeles, at the age of 96. Her papers and Browne's are in the library of the University of Michigan. In 2025, the Chicago International Puppet Theater Festival launched a symposium series named for Van Volkenburg.
