= Ottilie Turnbull Seybolt =

American theatrical director

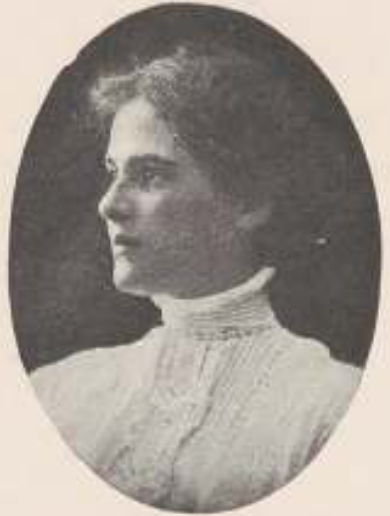
- Ottilie Turnbull (later Seybolt), from a 1910 yearbook
- Born: April 9, 1889; New Britain, Connecticut
- Died: September 10, 1978 (aged 89); Lane County, Oregon
- Occupations: Theatre professor, theatrical director

Ottilie Turnbull Seybolt (April 9, 1889 – September 10, 1978) was an American theatre professor and director. She was head of the drama program and a speech professor at the University of Oregon from 1928 until her retirement in 1955.

== Early life and education ==
Turnbull was born in New Britain, Connecticut, the daughter of George James Turnbull and Emily S. Nash Turnbull. She graduated from Mount Holyoke College in 1910. She earned a master's degree in English and drama from the University of Wisconsin in 1915, and pursued further studies at the Curry School of Expression in Boston, at Columbia University, and at the University of California.

== Career ==
Turnbull taught at the University of Wisconsin, Peru State Normal School in Nebraska, and Vassar College before becoming an assistant professor at Smith College in 1925. She joined the faculty of Grinnell College in 1927, and in 1928 became a professor of speech and drama department chair at the University of Oregon. She was active in the Very Little Theatre company, and director of the Guild players. She regularly directed, and sometimes acted in, college and community dramatic productions in Eugene in the 1930s and 1940s. "Mrs. Seybolt's portrayal of the tragic mother in the summer production of Ghosts was in the opinion of many, one of the outstanding pieces of acting in recent Guild hall plays," reported the Eugene Guard in 1936. She retired from the university in 1955.

Seybolt toured California for three weeks in 1929, studying little theatre programs in Pasadena, Santa Barbara, and Carmel, among other communities. She visited Hollywood film sets in 1938, and decided that "the screen must be accepted as an entirely different theatre from that of the stage, and the actor must change his method of work accordingly."

== Personal life ==
Turnbull married education professor Robert Francis Seybolt in 1913. They divorced before his second marriage in 1926. She traveled in her retirement, and gave poetry readings. In 1962 she suffered a head injury in a fall while teaching at the University of South Carolina. She died in 1978, at the age of 89, in Oregon.
