= Cornish College of the Arts =

Art school in Seattle, Washington

Cornish College of the Arts at Seattle University
- Former names: Cornish College of the Arts; Cornish School of Allied Arts; Cornish School of Music; The Cornish School
- Type: Private art college
- Established: 1914
- Founder: Nellie Cornish
- Parent institution: Seattle University
- Accreditation: Northwest Commission on Colleges and Universities
- Religious affiliation: Catholic Church (Jesuit)
- Endowment: $10.9 million (2021)
- Dean: Brian Harlan
- Total staff: 105
- Students: 443
- Location: Seattle, Washington, United States; 47°37′04″N 122°20′10″W
- Campus: 4 acres (1.6 ha); Urban
- Nickname: Redhawks
- Website: www.cornish.edu

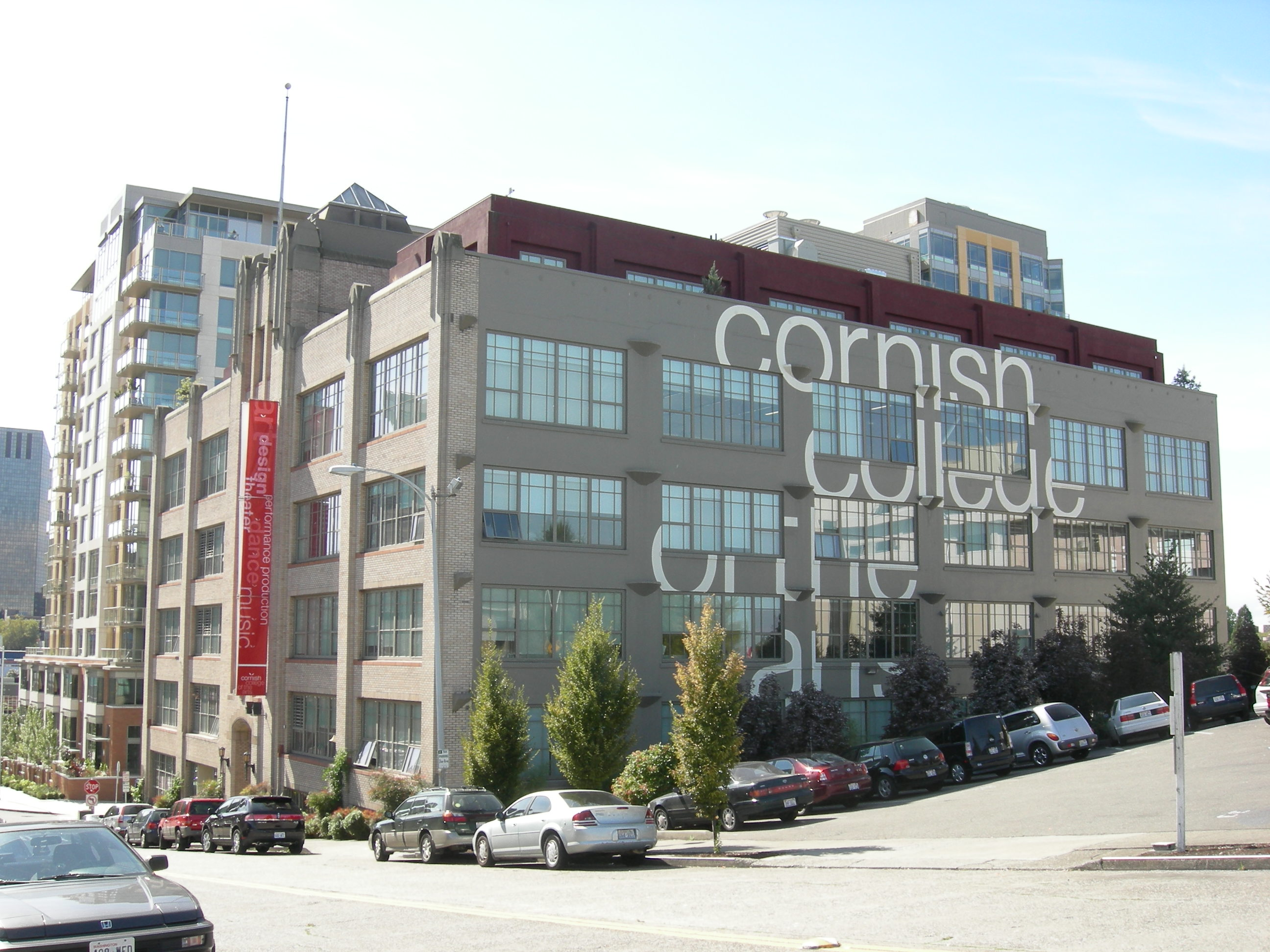
Like Kerry Hall, Cornish's main Denny Triangle building is on the National Register of Historic Places.

The Cornish College of the Arts is the art school of Seattle University, a private Jesuit university in Seattle, Washington, United States. Founded in 1914 by music teacher Nellie Cornish, it operated as a private art college until it was absorbed by Seattle University on June 2, 2025. The college's main campus is in the Denny Triangle portion of the South Lake Union neighborhood near downtown Seattle.

== History ==
Cornish College of the Arts was founded in 1914 as the Cornish School of Music, by Nellie Cornish (1876–1956), a teacher of piano; at that time, she had been teaching music in Seattle for 14 years. In 1915, the school was known as The Cornish School of Music Language and Dancing. Cornish would go on to serve as the school's director for its first 25 years, until 1939. The Cornish School of Music began its operations in rented space in the Boothe (or Booth) Building on Broadway and Pine Street.

As Cornish developed the idea of her school, she initially turned to the Montessori-based pedagogical method of Evelyn Fletcher-Copp, but turned at last to the progressive musical pedagogy of Calvin Brainerd Cady, who had worked as musical director with John Dewey as the latter set up his seminal progressive educational project, what is now the University of Chicago Laboratory Schools. Conceived by Cornish as "an elementary school of the arts—all the arts—with music as its major subject," the school initially taught only children, but it soon expanded to functioning also as a normal school (a teachers' college) under Cady. Within three years it had enrolled over 600 students, expanded the age range of its students to college age, and was the country's largest music school west of Chicago.

Nellie Cornish recruited opportunistically where she saw talent, and the school soon offered classes as diverse as eurhythmics, French language, painting, dance (folk and ballet), and theater. In 1915, the first full academic year, eurhythmics was added and the first studio arts classes taught. Dance, with a ballet focus, became a department in 1916 headed by Chicago-trained Mary Ann Wells. That year, Cornish became one of the first West Coast schools of any type to offer a summer session. After the closing of their influential Chicago Little Theatre, Maurice Browne and Ellen Van Volkenburg were brought in to found the Drama Department in 1918; the department, with its incorporation of scenic design, music, and dance in its productions, became central to Cornish's plans to ally the arts. Van Volkenburg also began a marionette department, the first such department in the country. By 1923, opera and modern dance had been added to the curriculum as well.

In 1920, in recognition that music was no longer the school's central focus, the school's name was simplified to The Cornish School. By this time, too, the school had expanded its age range, and was offering classes and lessons from early childhood to the undergraduate level. The school gathered a board of trustees from among Seattle's elite, who funded the school through the hard economic times during and after World War I, and raised money for a purpose-built school building. Finished in 1921, the Cornish School building, now known as Kerry Hall, opened for the 1921–22 academic year.

The Cornish Trio of the 1920s—Peter Meremblum, Berthe Poncy (later Berthe Poncy Jacobson), and Kola Levienne—may have been the first resident chamber music group at an American school. In 1935, Cornish established the first (but ultimately short-lived) college-level school of radio broadcasting in the U.S.

Through the 1920s, the school was often on the edge of financial failure, but was of a caliber that prompted Anna Pavlova to call it "the kind of school other schools should follow." Although the mortgage was paid off and the building had been donated to the school in 1929, financial difficulties inevitably grew during the Great Depression. Ultimately, convinced that finances would not allow the school to do more than "tread water", Nellie Cornish resigned her position as head of the school in 1939.

In December 2024, Cornish announced that it intended to merge with Seattle University and become the latter's flagship arts program when an agreement is finalized by May 2025. Under the proposal, the two colleges would maintain their separate campuses in the city; Cornish would retain its 379,564 square feet (35,262.6 m^{2}) of space for 500 students—a decline of 38 percent from peak enrollment in 2003. The merger became official on June 2, 2025.

== Campus ==
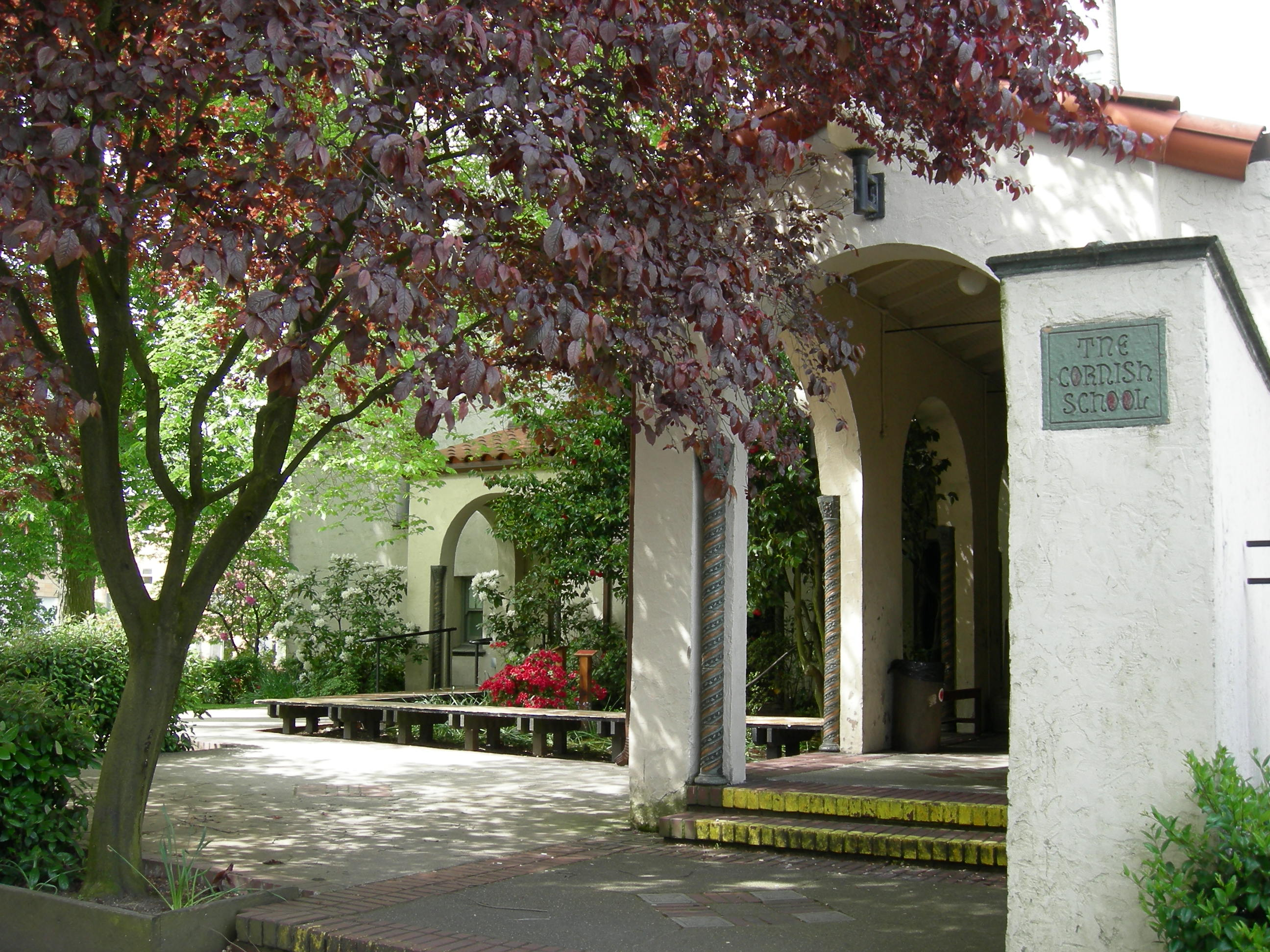
Kerry Hall, Cornish's original building, was the last part of Cornish remaining on Seattle's Capitol Hill until its 2024 sale.

Cornish College of the Arts operates a three-part campus in the South Lake Union, Seattle Center, and First Hill areas of Seattle, Washington. While Cornish was founded on Capitol Hill, it no longer owns or operates any buildings in the neighborhood.

=== Historic Capitol Hill Campus ===
- Cornish School
- U.S. National Register of Historic Places
- Location within Washington (state)
- Location: 710 E. Roy St., Seattle, Washington
- Coordinates: 47°37′32″N 122°19′19″W
- Area: less than one acre
- Built: 1921
- Architect: Abraham H. Albertson
- Architectural style: Spanish Colonial Revival
- NRHP reference No.: 77001337
- Added to NRHP: August 29, 1977

Cornish's historic campus is composed of its original 1921 building on Capitol Hill and its grounds. The building, now known as Kerry Hall, contains the 200-seat PONCHO Concert Hall. Kerry Hall was designed in the Spanish Colonial Revival style by leading Seattle architect Abraham H. Albertson and is on the National Register of Historic Places (NRHP) as the "Cornish School".

In April of 2024, Cornish announced their intention to sell Kerry Hall and finally sever their ties with their original location. The news prompted a sit-in from students calling for the space to be sold to an organization dedicated to preserving the historic location as a space for the arts. The student activists got their wish in November of 2024 when Kerry Hall was sold to the Seattle Theatre Group for $6 million who will continue using the space for the arts.

=== South Lake Union ===
Cornish opened its new Main Campus in 2003 in the Denny Triangle portion of the South Lake Union neighborhood in downtown Seattle. The 1928, Art Deco-style Main Campus Center is listed on the NRHP as "William Volker Building". Other buildings of note are the Raisbeck Performance Hall constructed in 1915, a Seattle City Landmark under the name "Old Norway Hall", and the 1929 Notion Building. In 2015, the college opened the new 20-story Cornish Commons, which contains a residence hall, studios, and meeting rooms.

==== Library ====
- William Volker Building
- U.S. National Register of Historic Places
- Location: 1000 Lenora St., Seattle, Washington
- Coordinates: 47°37′6″N 122°20′30″W
- Area: less than one acre
- Built: 1928
- Architect: Bittman, Henry & Adams, Harold
- Architectural style: Art Deco
- NRHP reference No.: 83004236
- Added to NRHP: October 13, 1983

The library at Cornish College specializes in art, dance, design, music, performance production, and theatre. As of 2011 it held 4,700 CDs, 40,000 books, has 2,200 videos, and subscribed to 154 periodicals. Its special collections include an image collection and 35 mm slides.

=== Seattle Center ===
Located on the Seattle Center grounds is the Cornish Playhouse at Seattle Center, the college's premier performance venue. Built for the Century 21 Exposition of 1962, the Playhouse was leased to Cornish by the City of Seattle in 2013. Along with the 440-seat main stage, the complex includes the 100+ seat Alhadeff Studio Theater and a scene shop.

=== First Hill ===
As of the start of the 2025 school year and Cornish's merger with Seattle University, Cornish students can now take classes and use the resources of Seattle University's First Hill Campus. Seattle University announced plans to connect their First Hill Campus with Cornish's South Lake Union Campus via a dedicated shuttle bus.

== Notable alumni ==
=== Actors ===
- Brendan Fraser, graduated from Cornish in 1990
- Jinkx Monsoon, graduated in 2010
- Ford Rainey, graduated in 1933
- Beatrice Straight

=== Fine artists ===
- Ria Brodell, graduated in 2002, painter and author
- Aleah Chapin, graduated in 2009, first American painter to win the prestigious BP Portrait Award from the National Portrait Gallery, London
- Monyee Chau, graduated in 2018
- Terry Fox, first-generation conceptual artist and a central participant in the West Coast performance art, video and sound scene of the late 1960s and 1970s
- Heather Hart, graduated in 1998, best known for her large art installations
- Jesper Myrfors, BFA in illustration, first art director of the collectible trading card game Magic: The Gathering
- Kumi Yamashita, graduated with a BFA in Art 1994

=== Musicians ===
- Mary Lambert, Grammy-nominated singer-songwriter, debuted on Capitol Records with her album Heart on My Sleeve
- Anna Oxygen, singer-songwriter, experimental electropop, performance artists
- Lena Raine, composer and producer, known for her video game soundtracks
- Reggie Watts, musician and comedian, studied music at Cornish in the early 1990s
- Ann Wilson, musician, member of the band Heart

=== Dancers ===
- Merce Cunningham, the best known alumnus of the dance department, matriculated in 1937 and was lured away by Martha Graham and her dance company in 1939
- Robert Joffrey, dancer and choreographer, studied at Cornish at some point, listed as a member of the alumni association

=== Filmmakers ===
- Skye Borgman BFA (Theater) 1994, director of the film Abducted in Plain Sight

=== Writers ===
- Margaret Cheney, author of Tesla: Man Out of Time
- Zack Davisson, writer and translator
