= Beverly Hills Little Theatre for Professionals =

Playhouse in California, US

Coordinates: 34.1002°N 118.3266°W

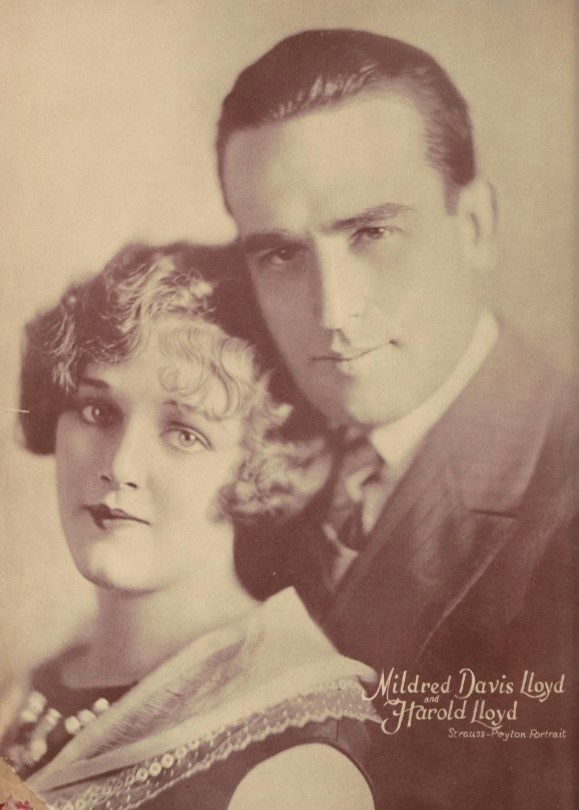
- Formation: 1931
- Headquarters: Beverly Hills, California
- Co-founder: Harold Lloyd (pictured with wife Mildred Davis Lloyd in 1926)

The Beverly Hills Little Theatre for Professionals, which grew out of a nationwide little theatre movement, was a playhouse founded by actor Harold Lloyd and others in 1931 in Beverly Hills, California. It was originally at the Wilkes Vine Street Theatre, now renamed the Ricardo Montalbán Theater, and some years later moved to a renovated location on Santa Monica Boulevard. It was a place for young stars to showcase their talents in the hope of being discovered by talent scouts. The theatre also filled a necessary gap for actors navigating the difficult transition from stage to film, and from silent pictures to talking ones.

== History ==
=== Early years ===
Before the theatre opened, it had been rumored around Hollywood as on its way, a natural extension of a national trend called the little theatre movement. It was likely inspired by the enormous success of the Hollywood Community Theater (1917–1922), founded by noted drama teacher Neely Dickson, that no longer had a permanent building after losing its lease. Photoplay's pseudonymous gossip columnist "Cal York" reported overhearing a woman who wrote features for the movie magazines, Franc Dillon, who was one of the earliest supporters and possibly a founder. Referring to her as "one of the fond parents of the Beverly Hill Little Theatre movement", he reported her speaking to Kenneth Harlan at Estelle Taylor's estate, and inviting him to be in one of the plays when the theatre would be established in the future. In 1935 Hollywood correspondent Dan Thomas wrote that they chose Beverly Hills because more cinema stars lived there than in Hollywood, and the whole point of the endeavor was involving the stars in stage productions, and inviting scouts to see the shows. The venue was a 400-seat theater, with the names of the founder-subscribers inscribed on the backs of the seats.

One of its earliest plays in 1932 was The Perfect Alibi, based on a play by A. A. Milne and starring Barbara Kent. In 1933 they produced The Good Fairy by Ferenc Molnár, directed by MGM dramatic coach, director, and UCLA lecturer Oliver Hinsdell, a man Photoplay described as one "who teaches the M-G-M starlets to say 'a-a-a-a—' and pull in the 'tummy.'" It starred Marion Clayton, J. Irving White, Kenneth Thomson, Richard Tucker, Harry Stubbs, Sidney Christie, and Francesca Braggiotti. Eve the Fifth was also performed in December 1933, directed again by Hinsdell and starring Patsy Ruth Miller, Russell Gleason, Mary Jo Ellis, William Burenn, and Paul Hurst. James Ellison was discovered while performing there in 1934. In 1933, 1934, and 1935 it performed a money-earner, The Drunkard, along with a companion piece at Tony Pastor's theatre in New York, The Drunkard Repents. The 19th-century version was a morality play that was one of the most successful ever until the theatrical version of Uncle Tom's Cabin–, but different adapters such as Les Smith in the 30s and Ruth Marion McElroy in the 40s turned it into a popular comedy.

Bitter Harvest was tried out there in 1934 before moving to the Hollywood Playhouse. Hope Loring directed the play Caprice there in 1934. In June 1935 it produced Lea Freeman's comedy A Widow in Green, directed by Dickson Morgan, and starring Grace Stafford, Alden Chase, Daisy Belmore, Colin Campbell, Kathleen Lockhart, Adele St. Maur, Beth Alden, and Viola Moore. That same year, immediately following the production, it offered John Entenza's A Notorious Lady, starring Paul De Ricon, Lora Treadwell, Adele Rowland, Grace Hale, and Robert Hoover, directed by Alexander Leftwich. In 1935, it also produced The Bellamy Trial, again directed by Dickson Morgan, and starring Barbara Kent and Jack Mulhall. Alice Martino of the Cumnock School of Expression and the Pasadena Playhouse was listed as having performed there sometime prior to 1938.

=== Young talent showcase ===
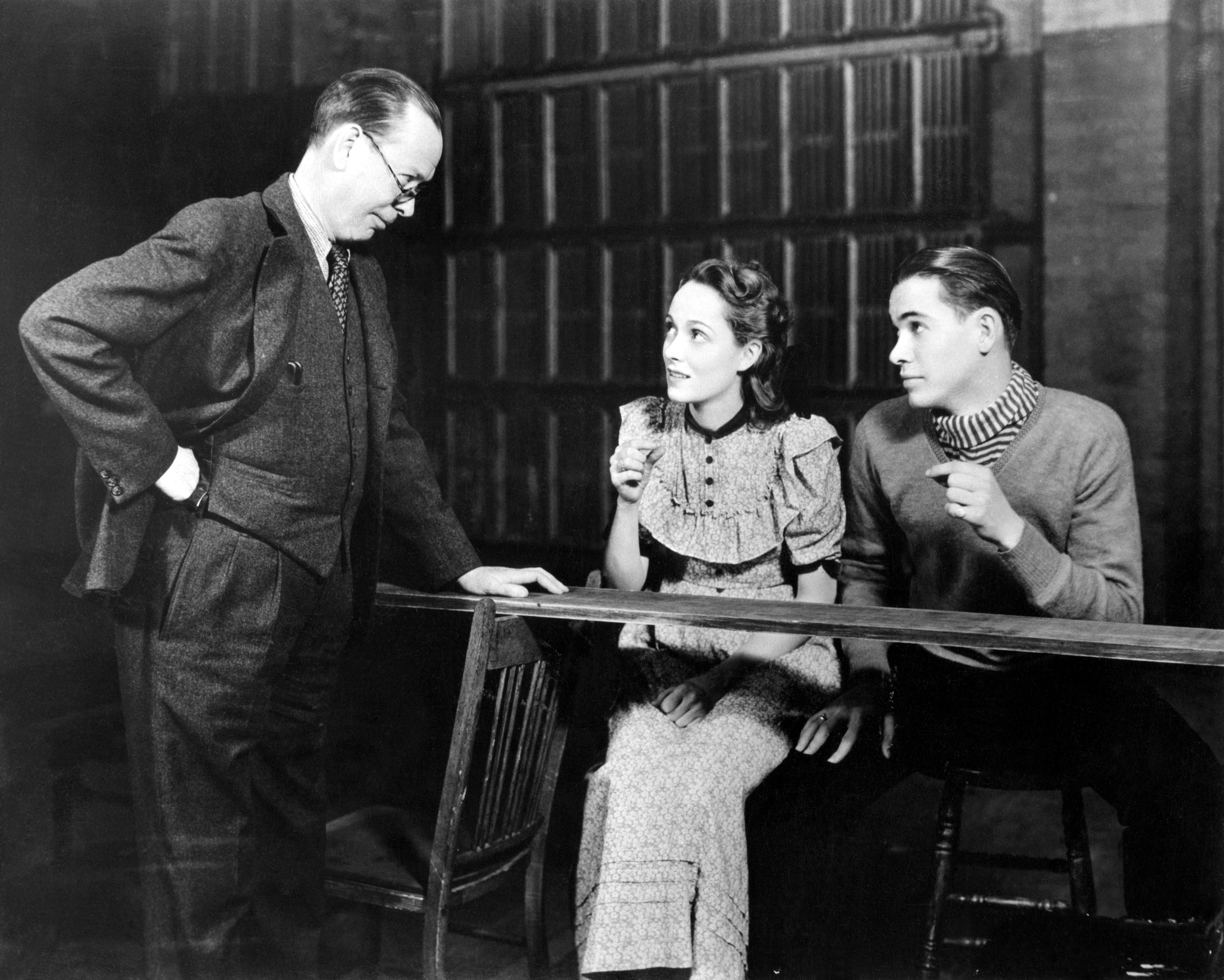
John Craven (right) on Broadway in Our Town, opposite his father Frank Craven. The year before, he got his first stage experience at the Beverly Hills Little Theatre for Professionals.

Paramount and other studios sometimes contracted with the theatre to showcase young actors. In 1937, actor John Craven performed there in The Thirteenth Chair and Noël Coward's Hay Fever, the latter also (possibly) with Joanne Jordan, who was said in her obituary to have acted in Coward plays at the theatre. Margaret Early also performed there in 1937, as did Claire Windsor, with Roger Kendal and Judith Arden. Elinor Davenport began there in 1937, later performing in the 1942 Jeanette MacDonald and Nelson Eddy film I Married an Angel. A group of young singers including Felix Knight, Marguerite Lamar, Robert Grandin, and Eloise Horton, accompanied by Arthur Carr and a string ensemble and emceed by Durward Grinstead, offered a night of "opera vignettes" in 1937. Marie Wilson appeared in three plays there, leading to a contract with Warner Brothers for 1938's Boy Meets Girl. One starlet named Maxine Fife appeared there in 1943 when she was just a senior in high school. Her subsequent movie studio contract required a judge's signature because she was under age. She certainly wasn't the youngest to launch her career there, however. In 1945 Jill St. John had her first stage role at the Little Theatre at age five. Lila Leeds also appeared there as a teenager in 1945, starring in one of the then-popular campus comedies. An actor named Howard Johnson produced a play there when he was a youth, saving $125 from his allowance (the anecdote may be tongue-in-cheek) for the expenses of the Emlyn Williams play Night Must Fall. He was discovered by John Cousins of the Musart and went on to work with Laird Cregar.

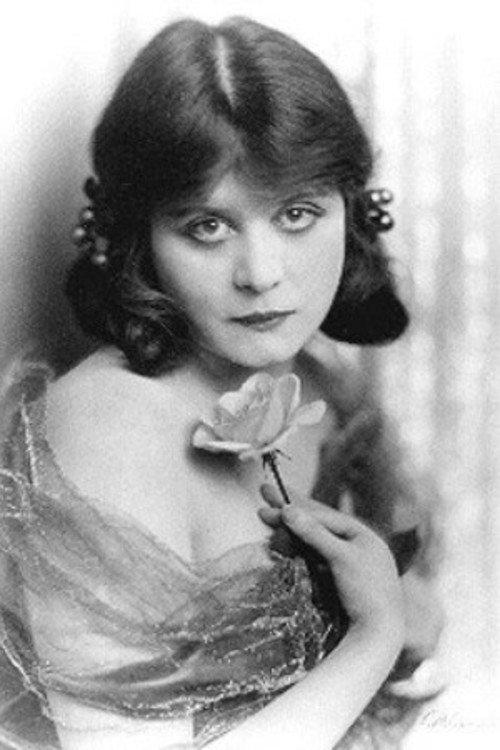
Theda Bara

=== A place to transition from stage to film, or from silent to talking pictures ===
From its start Variety noted that Hinsdell expected to use film actors in the plays to make it a showcase that would attract talent scouts. It also functioned as a way for actors to get back in front of studio eyes after a hiatus, and to demonstrate their vocal skills for the newer medium of sound movies. For example, Gene Stratton (stage name of Gene Stratton Monroe), granddaughter of author Gene Stratton-Porter, used to star in silent films based on her grandmother's books such as Keeper of the Bees, Laddie, and Freckles, all of which were turned into talking films in the mid-1930s. She acted at the Little Theatre in 1932. Columnist and producer James Leo Meehan – who happened to be her mother's second husband – noted that she hoped to use that stage to show that she could transition to the talking pictures, presumably because it was a place to hear their voices. Also making a rough transition from silent film, Theda Bara appeared there in Bella Donna in 1934, while she was married to Charles Brabin, with an audience reception that author Norman Zierold described as "more polite than enthusiastic." She later retired from acting. UCLA used appearance at the theatre as evidence an actor was working, for example noting in 1935 that young actor Morton Kiger gained stage experience there. It was also a place for New York actors to continue to work on stage while on the opposite coast.

=== Trivia ===
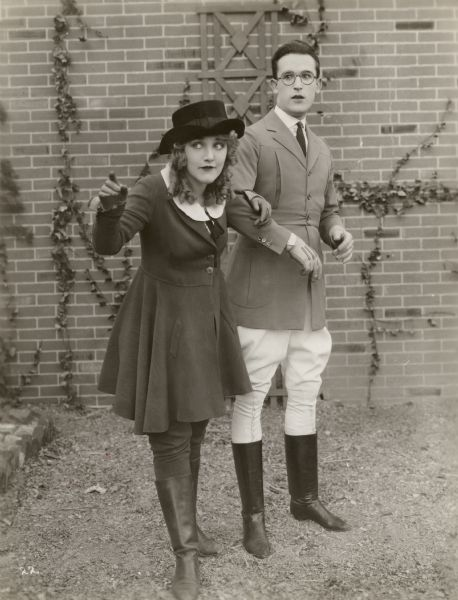
Mildred Davis Lloyd, for whom the theatre prize was named, and little theatre co-founder Harold Lloyd

An article in Variety stated that Lloyd's mother Elisabeth Fraser Lloyd (listed as Sarah Elisabeth Fraser), Gladys Lloyd Cassell (wife of Edward G. Robinson), and Sam Hardy served on the "coin-raising" committee. For three years, from 1932 to 1935, with its partner Vine Street Theatre, it also produced films under the name Mirror.

In 1935 a new theatre (the same playhouse in an improved venue) was announced as forthcoming, presumably at the Santa Monica boulevard address, and it was said to cost an estimated $100,000. Boosters hoped it would rival New York's Theatre Guild for influence. In 1938, an architecture magazine announced that Edwin Drake was renovating the "old" Beverly Hills Little Theatre building for his own group, the Patio Playhouse, but it is unclear when the Little Theatre actually changed locations.

In 1936 two of the theatre's actors, Martha Chapin and Elaine Johnson, were photographed by the Los Angeles Times as they readied an old horse car for a fundraising fair to be held on the Harold Lloyd Studios lot. The president and chair of the board from 1931 until at least 1936 was listed as Golda Madden Craig, and she coordinated the fair with Lloyd's mother Elisabeth Fraser Lloyd. The little theatre movement was also listed as a potential beneficiary.

Players could participate in an annual drama tournament hosted by the Los Angeles County Drama Association showing some of the reach of the little theatre movement in California. In 1933 the Los Angeles Evening Post-Record listed twelve little theaters in its region alone, including the Monrovia Players with Sad About Europe, the University College Players of USC with Listening, the Inglewood Community Players with The Cajun, the Little Theatre of the Verdugos with Out She Goes, the Dramateurs Polytechnic High School with The Geranium Lady, the Beverly Hills Community Players with The Mirage, the San Pedro Repertory Players with The Monkey's Paw, the University Dramatic Society of UCLA with Magoromo, a Japanese noh drama, the Touchstone Drama Shop of USC with Night in the Inn, and a surprise guest performance by the Beverly Hills Little Theatre for Professionals. They competed for the Mildred Davis Lloyd trophy, named for Harold Lloyd's wife.
