= Junior Guilders =

The Junior Guilders of Jamestown
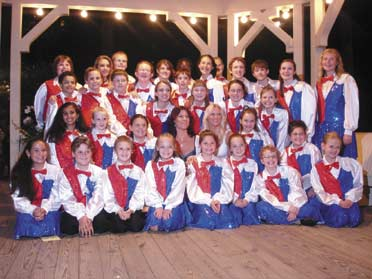
- The Junior Guilders posing for a picture in their traditional red, white, and blue sequin outfits.

Background information
- Also known as: Junior Guilders
- Origin: Jamestown, New York
- Genres: Show tunes, folk, jazz, blues, rock and roll
- Years active: 1983–Present
- Members: Helen Merrill
- Website: juniorguilders.weebly.com

The Junior Guilders are a singing group associated with the Lucille Ball Little Theatre of Jamestown, New York. Founded in 1983 by Helen Merrill and Lucille Miller, the Guilders get together each week to practice their singing, dancing, and acting. Their ages range from 7 to 16 and they use a wide variety of styles, including folk, jazz, blues, and rock and roll.

== History ==
Following Director Fredericka Woodard's casting of child orphans in the Little Theatre of Jamestown's production of Annie in 1982, numerous girls, heartbroken at not being cast but very talented in turn, gave Woodard the idea to establish a children's group of young performers. Woodard gave the idea to theater board member, actress, and friend, Helen Merrill. After almost being denied by the Board of Directors of LTJ, Merrill established the group in 1983 with longtime theater accompanist, Lucille Miller, accompanying the group on piano. Since that time, the group has grown from a dozen children to almost 40 performers. Helen Merrill remains its director. She also established and directs Children Sing, a minor organization of the Junior Guilders. Most Junior Guilders were formerly Children Sing members. Merrill died December 27, 2024.

== Performances ==
The Junior Guilders have performed in many locations, with common appearances at Elderhostels at nearby Chautauqua Institution. The Junior Guilders have also performed with an ABBA tribute act at Chautauqua, three times, singing "Thank You for the Music" and "I Have a Dream," with the latter being accompanied by Sign Language. The Junior Guilders have also been invited to Walt Disney World's Magic Music days celebration numerous times, most recently in April 2010 at Downtown Disney. The Guilders own the record for the longest continuous act in the history of the Chautauqua County Fair in Dunkirk, New York. Other performances outside of Jamestown have included Opryland, USA, performing as back up chorus for the late Sheri Lewis in Macy's Thanksgiving Day Parade, performing at the Rock and Roll Hall of Fame and receiving a standing ovation at the Mel Tillis Theater. They have also been featured at the White House honoring Congressman Amo Houghton. Most recently, the Junior Guilders performed at Hersheypark in August 2012. In July 2011, the group had the opportunity to perform with Jamestown native and recording artist Natalie Merchant. The Guilders have performed in numerous shows at the Lucille Ball Little Theatre most commonly at Christmas time, except for the 2013 season when the production was presented in May.

In May, 1991, to celebrate the achievements of deceased theater alumni, Lucille Ball, the Guilders presented a tribute show to Ball which paired with the honorary renaming of the former Little Theatre of Jamestown to the current Lucille Ball Little Theatre or Jamestown. Daughter Lucie Arnaz was present, sitting front row for the group's presentation of "Light the Candles." This show was revised and re-presented in 2011, as a part of Lucille Ball's 100th Birthday Celebration.

== Repertoire ==
- "We're Doing a Show"
- "The Best Little Theatre in Town"
- "On The Stage"
- "God Bless The U.S.A."
- "What A Wonderful World"
- "Thank You for the Music""
- "This Joint is Jumpin'"

Christmas songs

- "Wonderful Time of the Year"
- "Jingle Jolliest"
- "Santa MaJazz"
- "Marshmallow World"

== Sources ==
- Post Journal, July 8, 2008, "Guilders Slate Fundraising Breakfast"
- Post Journal, July 18, 2008, "Junior Guilders Marking 25th year at County Fair"
