= Kumi Yamashita =

Japanese artist (born 1968)

Detail of Constellation Mana by Kumi Yamashita

Yamashita Kumi is a Japanese artist based in New York. She was born in 1968 in Takasaki, Japan, and then relocated to the United States in high school as part of an exchange student program.

Yamashita received her Bachelor of Fine Arts in 1994 from Cornish College of the Arts in Seattle, Washington and completed her Master of Fine Arts in 1999 from the Glasgow School of Art in Scotland.

The artist is best known for her light and shadow sculptures constructed from everyday objects. Kumi first starts with photographing real models to begin understanding the different poses she works with. She expresses the importance of shadow manipulation and outline. The next steps into her work then is to sketch the composition out and develop the sense of space since placement is integral in each piece. Constellation Mana is from a series of portraits called "Constellation". Each of the works in this series is created by winding a single black thread around galvanized brads on a white board. The dark areas are produced solely by densely wound and overlapping thread. This technique is seen in the enlarged photograph of Constellation Mana.

== Awards ==
- 2014 – Crystal Kirin Award, Beijing, China
- 2014 – Special Merit Award, WAH Center, New York City
- 2000 – Kirin Art Award Special Recognition Second Prize, Japan
- 1995 – Betty Bowen Art Award Special Recognition, Washington, USA

== Exhibitions ==
Kumi Yamashita has been featured in multiple group exhibitions including her recent involvement in the 2023, Gallery Children's Biennial, National Gallery Singapore, and a few years before, she contributed 5 pieces to the exhibition, "Forgotten Faces: Visual Representation of Trauma and Mass Killings in Asia." featured in the Charles B. Wang Center.
