= Calvin Brainerd Cady =

American music educator (1851–1928)

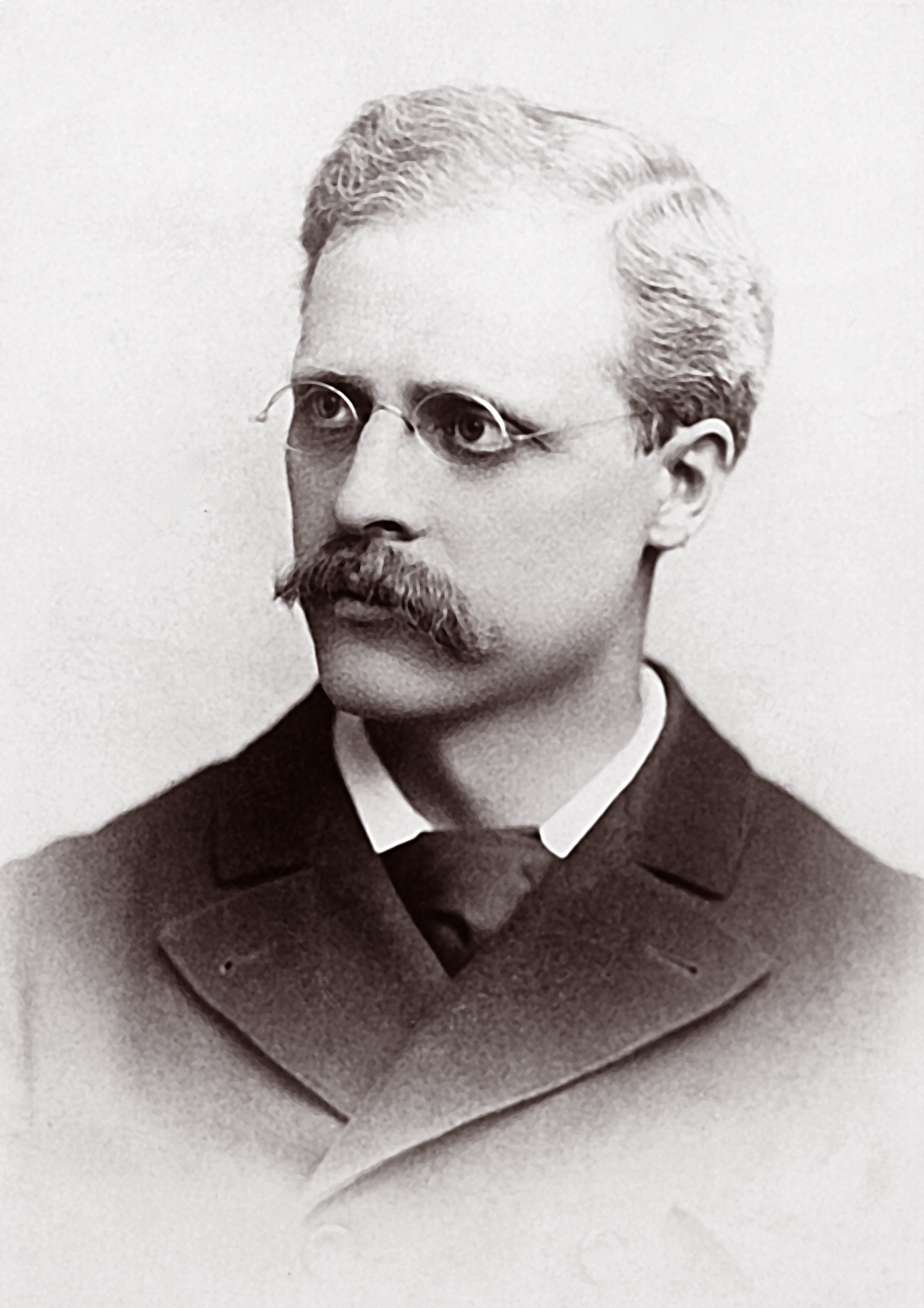
- Calvin Cady at the University of Michigan
- Born: June 21, 1851; Barry, Illinois, U.S.
- Died: June 29, 1928 (aged 77)
- Occupations: Musician, music teacher
- Known for: Leading educational philosopher and writer of the progressive era of education

Calvin Brainerd Cady (June 21, 1851 – May 29, 1928) was an American musician, music teacher, leading educational philosopher and writer of the progressive era of education in his subject area.

Cady founded the music department at the University of Michigan, now the University of Michigan School of Music, Theatre & Dance. He became known for his pedagogical theories of music education that emphasized the unification of children’s thoughts and feelings, while working with John Dewey at the University Elementary School, today's University of Chicago Laboratory Schools and later at the Cornish School, now Cornish College of the Arts in Seattle. Cady was a leader in advocating for degree programs in music within university curricula, and who “believed that music should be taught as a means to further understanding of the liberal arts.”

== Early life ==
Born in small town Barry, Illinois, Cady was the son of the Reverend Cornelius Sidney and Rebecca T. Morgan Cady. His family was originally of Connecticut stock. He was of English and Welsh ancestry.

== Education ==
Cady received his early education in the public schools, and studied in the preparatory program of Oberlin College and music at the Oberlin Conservatory of Music, from which he graduated in 1872. While studying at Oberlin, he taught music in Oberlin public schools. He then spent two and a half years in musical studies at Leipzig, Germany from 1872-4, studying organ under Benjamin Robert Papperitz and pianoforte, harmony, and counterpoint under Ernst Richter, and under Oscar Paul.

== Academic career ==
=== Oberlin and Michigan ===
Returning to the United States, Cady taught harmony and piano at the Oberlin College Conservatory from 1874 to 1879. He was appointed Instructor in Music at the University of Michigan in 1880, and was promoted to Acting Professor of Music in 1885. Cady is credited with founding the Department of Music at Michigan and championing music as an integral part of the university curriculum. He was, in fact, the first in the United States to teach music as a major subject for the degrees of bachelor of arts and master of arts. His later association with John Dewey in the formation of the Laboratory School at the University of Chicago suggests a relationship with the philosopher when the latter joined the faculty at Michigan in 1886. Cady resigned his academic post in 1888 when Albert A. Stanley of Leipzig was appointed head of the department, which a few years later was split off from the university proper as the University School of Music.

=== With Dewey in Chicago, in Boston, in New York at Columbia and IMA ===
From 1888 to 1901 he was a teacher of music in Chicago at the Chicago Conservatory. During these same years, from 1892 to 1894, he was editor of The Music Review. Also in this period, in 1894, Cady joined John Dewey at the newly formed University Elementary School, often called the Laboratory School, of the University of Chicago, where he served as director of the music department. In 1901, he moved to Boston, where he produced his three volume work, Music-Education. He moved to New York City in 1907 to become lecturer in music pedagogy at the Columbia Teachers’ College till 1910, and from 1908–13, he held a similar post at the Institute of Musical Art (IMA), which was later subsumed by the Juilliard School of Music.

=== At the Cornish School ===
Cady taught a normal (teacher education) class in Los Angeles in 1911 that was attended by piano instructor Nellie Cornish. She writes that she was deeply impressed by his opening lecture, which argued that the education of music students should include the “allied arts.” They formed a connection that helped bring Cady to the Pacific Northwest in 1913 where he provided intellectual guidance to the school Cornish founded in Seattle in 1914, the Cornish School of Music (The Cornish School, after 1920) and to Portland, Oregon, where he founded the Music-Education School, an elementary school for boys and girls. After a 1915-1916 academic sabbatical from Columbia spent in the Pacific Northwest, in 1916 he accepted the post of dean of normal education at Cornish. As the school expanded to include the allied arts, becoming at last The Cornish School, Cady oversaw the parallel expansion of his theories to the teaching of dance, theater, art, and design. He served in this capacity until his death in 1928.

== Personal life ==
Calvin Brainerd Cady married Josephine Upson of Tallmadge, Ohio, August 12, 1872 and with her had four children: Alice Morgan, Francis Elmore, Camelia Louise, and William James. He was married for the second time to Elizabeth Hoar June 5, 1915. He was a follower of Christian Science.
