= Negro Little Theatre Movement =

African American theatre movement in the United States

The Negro little theatre movement was a movement of African American theatre groups in the United States during the 1910s, 1920s and 1930s. The movement was part of the broader Little Theatre Movement and was associated with the Harlem Renaissance, historically Black colleges and universities, settlement houses, churches, libraries and community organizations.

The movement sought to develop theatre by Black artists, about Black life and for Black audiences. Its participants used small-scale, non-commercial theatre to create roles and productions outside the control of Broadway and the commercial touring circuit. Writers and educators associated with the movement debated whether African American theatre should serve an openly political purpose or focus on artistic and cultural expression.

== Background ==
In the early 20th century, little theatre groups in the United States offered an alternative to commercial theatre. Irish, Yiddish and other ethnic theatre groups provided models for theatre based on community audiences and cultural expression. African American theatre artists, educators and community leaders adapted the little theatre model to create spaces where Black performers, playwrights and audiences could represent Black life outside white commercial control.

Broadway productions about African American life existed before and during the movement, but many were written, produced or controlled by white artists and producers. Advocates of Black little theatre argued that African American writers, directors, actors and audiences could present Black life without relying on racial stereotypes.

Many Black little theatre groups formed during the 1920s. Some lasted for only one production, while others became part of longer-running institutions. Their venues included libraries, churches, community centers, settlement houses and college campuses.

== College and community theatre ==
African American college theatre became one of the movement's major centers. Around 1920, theatre groups developed at historically Black colleges and universities, including Howard University, Morgan College, Hampton Institute, Virginia State College and Virginia Union University.

The Negro Intercollegiate Dramatic Association was organized in 1930 and held competitions among college theatre groups. Randolph Edmonds credited the growth of university and community theatre with giving the movement more structure and continuity.

== Howard Players ==
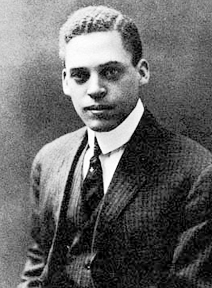
Ernest Everett Just helped organize Howard University's early drama group.

The Howard Players developed from Howard University's early student drama activities. Ernest Everett Just, then an English instructor at Howard, helped organize the College Dramatic Club in 1909. The name Howard Players was adopted in 1920, with Alain Locke and Thomas Montgomery Gregory serving as faculty advisers.

Howard became an important center for Black drama during the 1920s. Locke and Gregory helped shape debates over the purpose of African American drama and the role of theatre in representing Black life.

== Krigwa Players ==
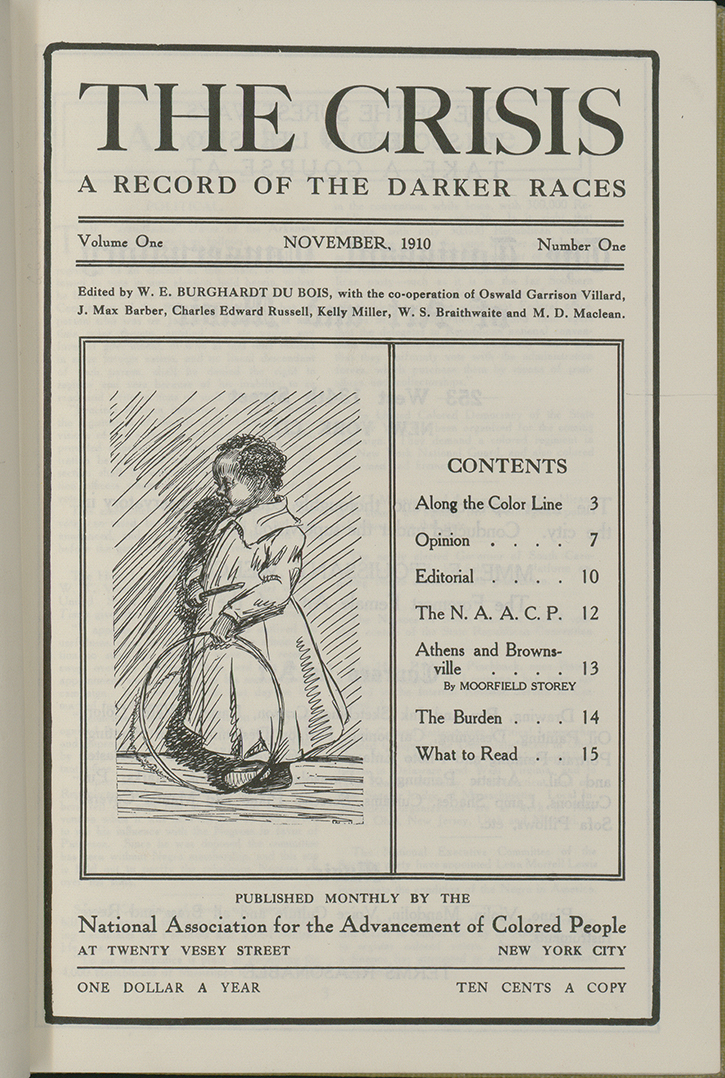
The Crisis, edited by W. E. B. Du Bois, helped support new Black drama.

The Krigwa Players, also known as the Krigwa Players Little Negro Theatre, were based in Harlem and were associated with W. E. B. Du Bois and The Crisis, the magazine of the NAACP. Du Bois served as chairman of the group. The name "Krigwa" came from the Crisis Guild of Writers and Artists.

The Krigwa Players used contests in The Crisis to find plays by Black writers. Du Bois argued that a Black theatre should be "about us", "by us", "for us" and "near us".

One of the group's best-known productions was Eulalie Spence's one-act comedy Fool's Errand, which won second prize at the 1927 Samuel French Little Theatre Tournament. The company later split over questions of finances and organization. Ethel Pitts Walker identified weak organization and limited technical resources as factors in its decline.

== Gilpin Players ==
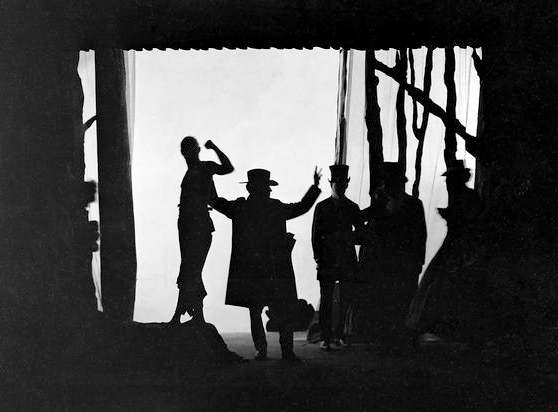
The Gilpin Players' production of The Emperor Jones

The Gilpin Players were based in Cleveland and were associated with the Playhouse Settlement, later known as Karamu House. Russell and Rowena Jelliffe began producing plays with interracial casts in 1917. In 1920, the Playhouse Settlement sponsored the Dumas Dramatic Club, which was renamed the Gilpin Players in 1922 in honor of actor Charles Sidney Gilpin.

The Gilpin Players became one of the better-known African American theatre groups of the period and helped establish Karamu House as a center for Black theatre in Cleveland.

== Art and propaganda debate ==
A central debate in the movement concerned whether African American theatre should have an explicit political purpose. Du Bois argued that art could not be separated from social purpose and believed theatre should challenge racism while representing Black life on Black terms.

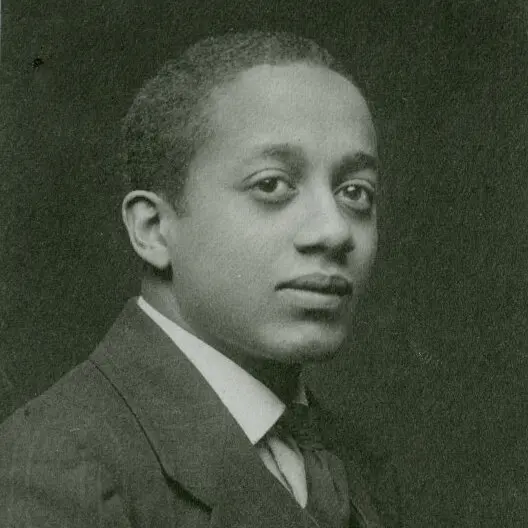
Alain Locke differed with Du Bois over the role of political messaging in African American theatre.

Locke took a different view. He supported theatre that presented Black culture and folk life, but he was wary of reducing art to protest or propaganda. The disagreement between Du Bois and Locke reflected a broader Harlem Renaissance debate over whether Black art should prioritize political advocacy, cultural representation or artistic autonomy.

== Legacy ==
The Negro little theatre movement influenced later African American theatre groups, including the American Negro Theatre in Harlem. The American Negro Theatre was founded in 1940 by Abram Hill and Frederick O'Neal. During its early years, the company performed in the basement of the 135th Street Branch of the New York Public Library.

The American Negro Theatre's best-known production was Anna Lucasta, which moved to Broadway after its Harlem run. Although the American Negro Theatre began after the main period usually associated with the Negro little theatre movement, it continued the movement's emphasis on Black-controlled theatre and community-based production.
