= Monyee Chau =

Asian American Artist based in Seattle, Washington

Monyee Chau is an Asian American artist based out of Seattle, Washington.

== Background ==
Chau's ancestry is from Hong Kong and Taiwan. Chau and her family lived in the Seattle's Chinatown-International District in the East Kong Yick Building. Chau's family owned a seafood restaurant. Chau graduated from the Cornish College of the Arts in 2018.

== Career ==
In 2020, Monyee Chau designed a poster that went viral on Instagram with the phrase "Yellow Peril Supports Black Power" with a black panther and a yellow tiger after the murder of George Floyd. The post initially hit over 50,000 likes but received mixed reaction online.

In winter 2022, Chau, alongside other local artists, had worked at the Wing Luke Museum teaching students about mural paintings, which resulted in the students creating two mural art installations in the Chinatown-International District neighborhood.

In 2023, Chau was appointed Artist in Residence for the Seattle Public Library. In January of that year, Chau designed the warmup jerseys to celebrate the Year of the Rabbit for the Seattle Kraken match against the Colorado Avalanche. Chau also had an artist residency alongside artist Jae Eun Kim at Flower Flower, an all queer, all trans Asian and Pasifika artist collective, where they conducted interviews with Seattle Chinatown-International District's CID Coalition elders and then created their portraits. Those portraits were later displayed from April 2024 to mid 2025 at the Wing Luke Museum for the exhibition "Hello Auntie, Hello Uncle: Conversations with Our Elders."

In 2024, Chau's mural Of Salt and Altars debuted at the Tacoma Art Museum. Of Salt and Altars was part of the Finding Home: The Chinese American West, curated by Lele Barnett for the [re]Frame multi-part series, which invited curators to color to engage and challenge works in the museum's Haub Family collection. Chau has cited historian Gordon H. Chang's book, Ghosts of Gold Mountain, as being crucial in helped them gain a deeper understanding of Chinese laborers in the United States. In May of that same year, Chau collaborated on a limited edition drinkware collection with Starbucks to honor Asian, Asian American, Native Hawaiian and Pacific Islander Heritage Month.

In 2025, Chau, alongside other local artists and organizations, participated mentoring 10 teen artists for the Seattle Office of Arts & Culture's Fresh Perspectives Program, which was funded by Seattle Public Utilities through the 1% for Art Fund.
