= Lucille Ball Little Theatre =

Theater company

Coordinates: 42.095561°N 79.240111°W

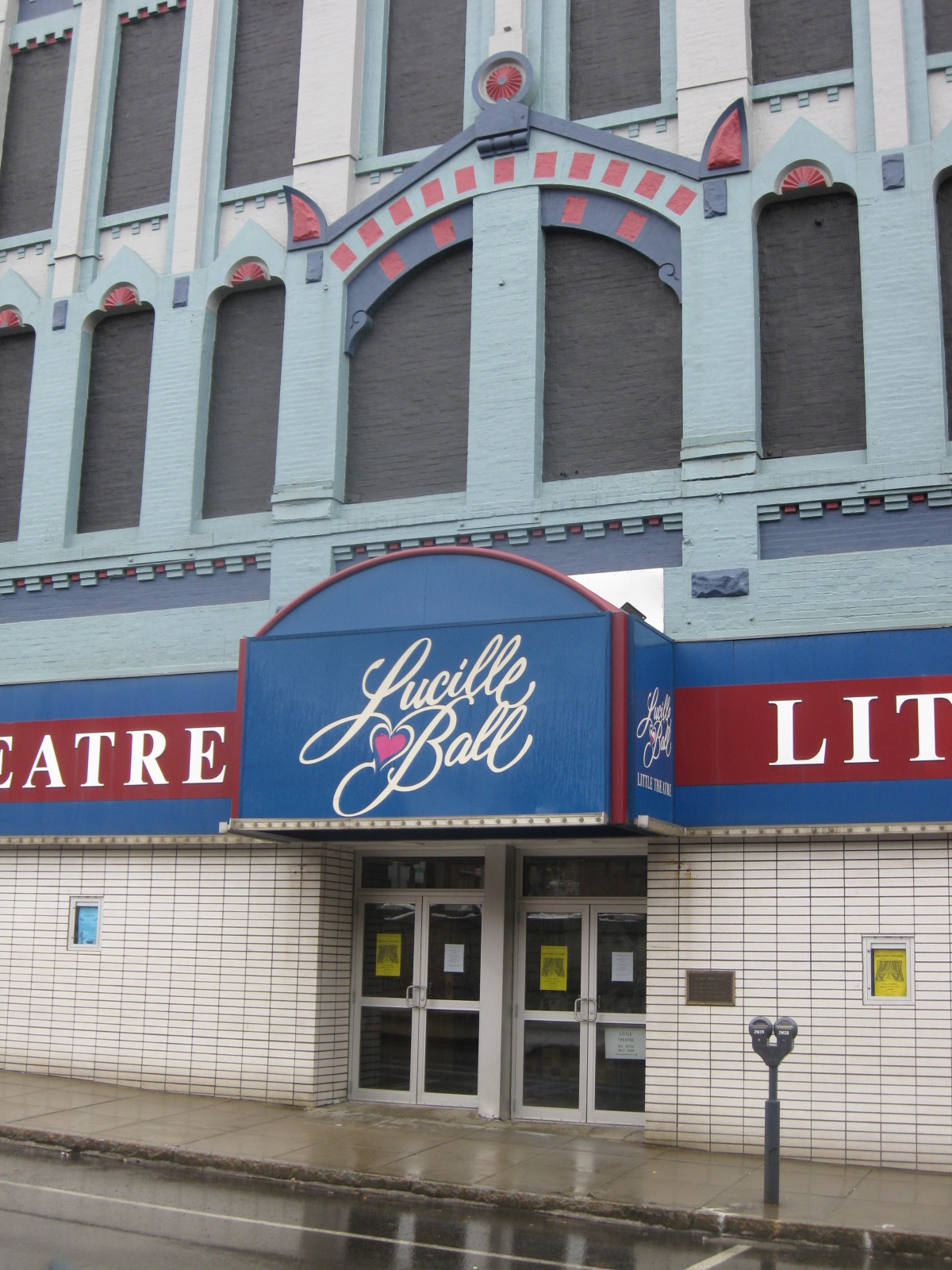
The Lucille Ball Little Theatre in Ball's hometown of Jamestown, New York

Lucille Ball Little Theatre of Jamestown is a community theatre company located in Jamestown, New York. It evolved from the Jamestown Players Club and was established as a non-profit corporation in 1936 with the name Little Theatre of Jamestown. The company has its own theatre on East Second St. in Jamestown which it purchased in 1968. Both the company and its theatre were renamed the Lucille Ball Little Theatre of Jamestown in 1991 to honor the actress Lucille Ball, Jamestown's most famous resident. Ball got her acting start with the company's precursor The Players Club and returned in 1945 to perform in a series of skits with the company in Chautauqua's Smith-Wilkes Hall. Throughout her life, she would send the company cash donations as well as costumes from her television and film career. One of her donations, a costume from the film Gone With the Wind is still used by the company.

== Company theatre ==
Lucille Ball Little Theatre of Jamestown
- Company type: non-profit corporation
- Industry: community theatre company
- Founded: 1969
- Founder: Abner E. Allen
- Headquarters: Jamestown, New York
- Key people: Charles Samuels

Since 1969, the company's home has been located at 18 East Second St. in Jamestown. The building began its life in 1881 as Allen's Opera House. Its proprietor, Abner E. Allen, sold the theatre to Charles Samuels in 1898 when it became known as Samuels Opera House. It was then acquired by the MA Shea Corporation in 1919 and in 1925 was extensively and elegantly refurbished in a Spanish style, which can still be seen in its facade. The Shea Theatre was initially used for vaudeville performances but with the decline of the genre it was turned into a cinema. By the early 1960s the cinema had closed and the building was derelict. It was purchased in 1968 by the Little Theatre of Jamestown, and new theatre was built inside the shell of the old one. The renovated theatre was opened in 1969. Officially renamed the Lucille Ball Little Theatre in 1991, it has a seating capacity of 402, a full stage, and a small lobby.

== See also ==
- Little Theatre Movement
- Junior Guilders
