= Maurice Browne =

American poet (1881–1955)

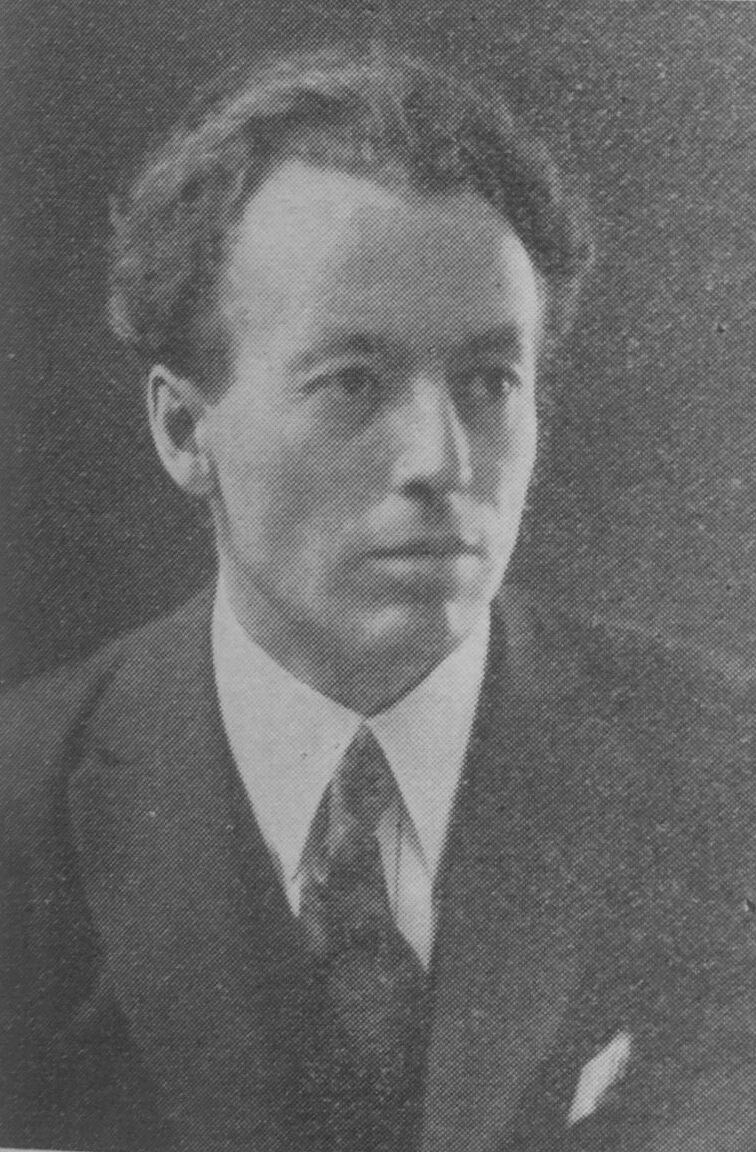
- Maurice Brown, circa 1918
- Born: 12 February 1881; Reading, England
- Died: 21 January 1955 (aged 73); Torquay, England
- Resting place: Dartington church yard
- Spouse: Ellen Van Volkenburg

Maurice Browne (12 February 1881 – 21 January 1955) was a man of the theatre in the United States and the United Kingdom. A poet, actor and theatre director, he has been credited, along with his then-wife Ellen Van Volkenburg, as the founder of the Little Theatre Movement in America through his work with the Chicago Little Theatre.

== Early life ==
He was born in Reading, England, the son of the Rev. Frederick Herbert Browne, a graduate of Wadham College, Oxford and head of Ipswich School, and his wife Frances Anne Neligan, daughter of the Rev. Maurice Neligan D.D.

He was educated at Temple Grove School and Winchester College. In 1894 his father committed suicide, leaving four children. Frances moved to Eastbourne to run a school, and Maurice moved to Eastbourne College. From there he won a scholarship to Peterhouse, Cambridge, where he matriculated in Michaelmas Term 1900, having first joined up to the British Army and spent time in South Africa during the Second Anglo-Boer War. He graduated B.A. in 1903.

== Career ==
At Cambridge Browne struck up a friendship with Louis Wilkinson. He belonged to a poetic coterie with Harold Monro who became a close friend, Guy Noel Pocock and Herman Leonard Pass. He wrote no more poetry once he graduated. In 1904 Browne was teaching at St. Paul's School, Darjeeling.

On his return to London, Browne became involved in printing and publishing. As a small press publisher he concentrated on verse. He ran the Samurai Press (active 1907–1909) with Harold Monro, who had married his sister Dorothy in 1901 (they divorced 1916); the name referenced A Modern Utopia by H. G. Wells.

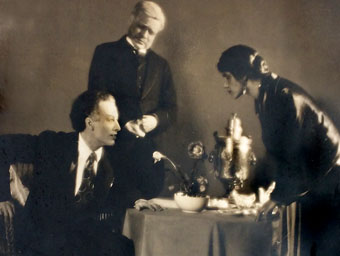
Chicago Little Theatre, c.1912

Meeting Ellen Van Volkenburg at Florence when travelling in Italy, Browne went to Chicago to marry her in 1912. That year they adapted a space in the Fine Arts Building to create the Chicago Little Theatre. In 1921, Browne and Volkenburg acted in the performance of George Bernard Shaw's The Philanderer at the Cornish School playhouse. They ran the theatre for five years. They went on to found the department of drama at the Cornish School in Seattle in 1918.

At the opening night of the Theatre of the Golden Bough, Volkenburg had the title-role in Browne's play, The Mother of Gregory, which played June 6, 7, and 14, 1924.

Browne's greatest triumph came in 1929 when he produced Journey's End, by R. C. Sherriff in London. The production was also highly profitable for him. He was able to invest in stakes in the Globe Theatre and Queen's Theatre in London's West End.

== Death ==
Browne died on 21 January 1955 in Torquay, England.
