= Little Theatre Gateshead =

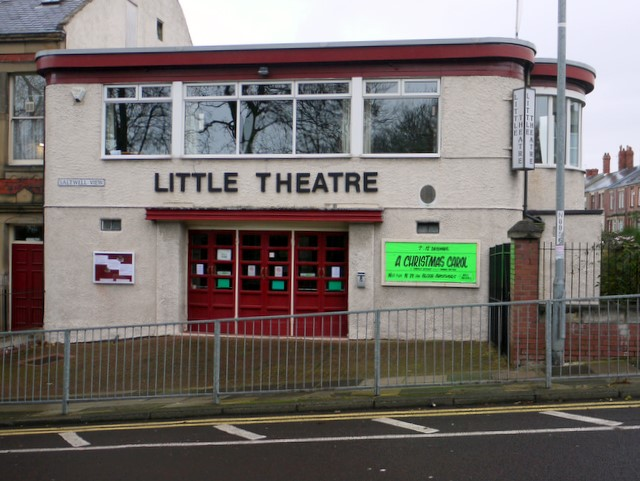
Little Theatre, Saltwell View, Gateshead

The Little Theatre Gateshead is Gateshead's only theatre. It was built during World War II, thanks to the generosity of sisters Ruth, Sylvia and M. Hope Dodds. It is believed that the theatre is the only one built in Britain during the war. The building process was interrupted by hostilities after the site was acquired in 1939, being at one time requisitioned as a barrage balloon station, and at another having windows and doors damaged by a bomb falling in Saltwell Park, just across the road. The opening performance on 13 October 1943, was A Midsummer Night's Dream. The theatre is home to the Progressive Players Ltd, who produce ten plays per year. The roots of the Progressives were in the Gateshead branch of the Independent Labour Party, but the group is now non-political.

== History ==
The theatre was built on a derelict site which would have housed numbers 1 & 2, Saltwell View. Number 3 was purchased and incorporated into the new building immediately. The theatre and the Progressive Players went from strength to strength, but for several years in the 1960s and 70s, the threat of compulsory purchase and demolition to make way for a new road hung over everything. Once the threat was removed, plans to improve and update could advance. In 1989, number 4 was purchased to ease overcrowding and permit expansion of facilities. It now houses a rehearsal space cum coffee bar cum art gallery on the ground floor, while most of the upper floors are devoted to wardrobe storage and workroom.

In 2012–13, considerable reconstruction and renovation work to the frontage, foyer and bar of the theatre was carried out, thanks to a generous legacy from former member Jim Ord. Further alterations in 2015 have added another dressing room and a small office to house archival material, as well as providing easier access to the backstage area from the Wardrobe facilities.

In between Progressive Players productions, the premises are available for hire, e.g. by schools, colleges, other dramatic or operatic societies, for performances, and by other bodies for meetings or conferences. The theatre is largely self-supporting.

In August 2021 the theatre re-opened o members following closure due to the COVID-19 Pandemic. During the closure, the Little Theatre Gateshead and Progressive Players, completed funding on an extension, which will have its official opening in October 2021. The extension has created a new studio space, which will be primarily used for rehearsals and as a potential cabaret space. It too will be available for outside hire.

== Progressive Players ==
The theatre is home to the Progressive Players Ltd. (founded in 1920) who produce ten plays per year. The roots of the Progressives were in the Gateshead branch of the Independent Labour Party, but the group is now non-political.

At a meeting of the British Drama League in the twenties, the Progressives' representative handed over to George Bernard Shaw royalties of seven shillings and fourpence, possibly on the takings of Pygmalion which had raked in the grand sum of £16.00. A short time later, the Progressives followed Shaw's advice to turn themselves into a company.

The group and the Theatre are still going, thanks in part to the generosity of Gateshead Metropolitan Borough Council, Northern Arts and the National Lottery Commission, but mainly to the continued efforts of the members (volunteers) and the support of their audiences.

In 2020, the group celebrated their Centenary, although physical celebrations were put on hold due to the COVID-19 Pandemic. After a nineteen-month halt in productions, the first performance back will be "Lockdown in Little Grimley" by David Tristram, in October 2021.

In March 2021, the Progressive Players entered the Durham and Sunderland One Act Festival, with two performances. Owing to the ongoing pandemic, all performances were submitted via Zoom, and watched online. The Signalman (by Charles Dickens and adapted by Matthew Harper) was successful in winning the first round and make it through the semi-final of the All England Theatre Festival, held in Saltburn. From here, the Progressive Players won this heat and performed in the final, in Bridlington.
