= Maly theatre =

The Maly Theatre, or Mali Theatre, may refer to one of several different theatres:

- The Maly Theatre (Moscow), also known as The State Academic Maly Theatre of Russia, in Moscow (founded in 1756 and given its own building in 1824)
- The Maly Theatre (St.Petersburg), also known as The Academic Maly Drama Theatre, also known as The European Theatre, in St.Petersburg (founded in Leningrad in 1944)
- The Karl Knipper Theatre, formerly in St Petersburg
- The Maly Opera Theatre in Leningrad (1918–1998), before 1918 and since 2007 known as the Mikhaylovsky Theatre
