= Las Vegas Little Theater =

American community theater in Nevada

Las Vegas Little Theatre
- Interactive map of Las Vegas Little Theatre
- Address: 3844 Schiff Drive; Las Vegas, Nevada
- Coordinates: 36.171971°N 115.144615°W
- Capacity: 155 (Mainstage)
- Type: Local authority

Construction
- Opened: 1978

Website
- lvlt.org

Las Vegas Little Theater is a community theater in Las Vegas, Nevada that was founded in 1978 by Jack Bell and Jack Nickolson. Acting classes are available. It is the oldest operating small theater in the valley.
