= M. Hope Dodds =

English author and historian (1885–1972)

Madeleine Hope Dodds known as M. Hope Dodds (2 January 1885 – 13 May 1972) was an English author and historian who wrote The Pilgrimage of Grace 1536–1537, and the Exeter Conspiracy, 1538. She had three sisters and one brother, their parents were Edwin and Emily Dodds. She and two of her sisters founded the Little Theatre Gateshead.

== Early life ==
Madeleine Hope Dodds was the second of five children of Edwin Dodds, of Home House, Gateshead, County Durham, and Emily (née Bryham). She had three sisters and a brother. One of her grandfathers had a printing business and the other, John Mawson, was Sheriff of Newcastle.

She went to a girls-only high school called Gateshead High School. After she graduated high school in 1904, she attended Newnham College, Cambridge for two years. Dodds was able to pass within those two years with Second Class Honors in the History Tripos. Dodds was able to get her degree years later because at the time when she attended the college, women were not able to obtain any degree. Newnham College, Cambridge is still one of the few colleges that still give out education to exclusively women.

== Writing career ==
Dodds began writing for the Victoria History of the Counties of England in 1907 contributing towards the history of Durham. Finding herself short of funds for her education she wrote to the publication's editor with the support of her tutor at Newnham. She offered to work more on Durham or on Northumberland. William Page agreed that she would join his staff and later she continued as an outworker being paid for every 1,000 words about Darlington. Dodds' college thesis on the bishops of Durham's boroughs gained her the Creighton memorial prize in 1909.

In 1915, Madeleine Hope Dodds and her sibling, Ruth, wrote The Pilgrimage of Grace, 1536–1537, and the Exeter conspiracy, 1538, which was published by the Cambridge University Press. Their work is still being recognised a century later. Their book appeared in The American Historical Review, which reviews historical pieces from 1895 to the present. Their work is well respected by scholars who are still alive to this day. Dodds was also featured in a book called, In Search of the New Woman: Middle-Class Women and Work in Britain 1870–1914, which briefly describes her work. Not only did she write The Pilgrimage of Grace, 1536-1537, and the Exeter Conspiracy, 1538 with her sister in 1915, she also wrote journals in her career, like "The Problem of the 'Ludus Coventriae'" and "Political Prophecies in the Reign of Henry VIII". The journals that Dodds have published can range from theatre and poetry to morality, religion and history. Dodds was also one of many who worked for the Newcastle Society of Antiquaries in 1908. In 1947 she was promoted to be an honorary member by the society that she worked for.

== Death and legacy ==
Dodds died in 1972. There is a plaque to her and her elder sisters, Ruth and Sylvia, noting that they founded the Little Theatre Gateshead that was installed in 2005. The plaque is on their home in Low Fell in Gateshead they shared for most of their lives.
