= Chicago Little Theatre =

American theater company

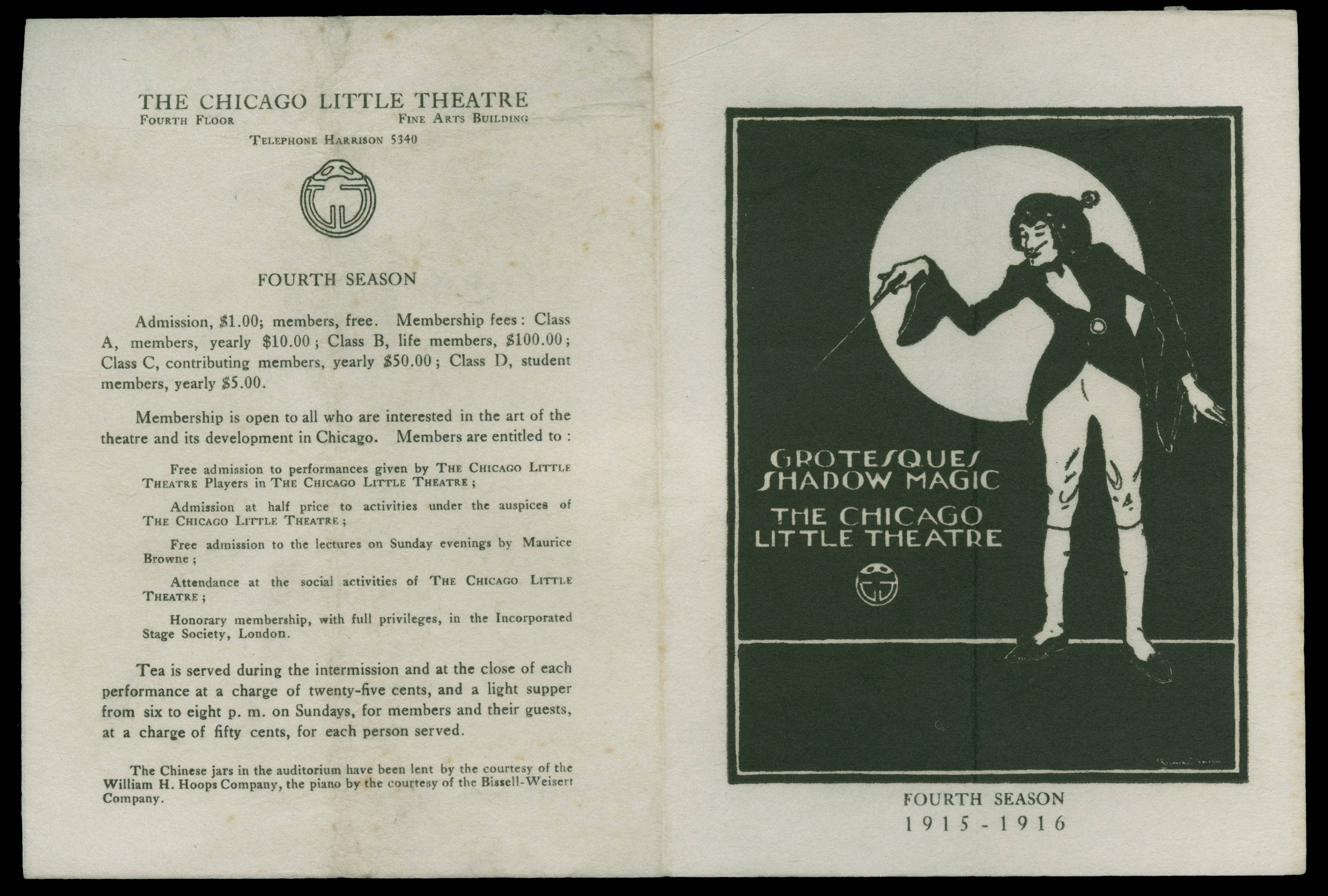
- Chicago Little Theatre program, 1915
- Interactive map of Chicago Little Theatre
- Address: 412 South Michigan Avenue
- Location: Chicago, Illinois, U.S.
- Coordinates: 41°52′35″N 87°37′28″W
- Owner: Ellen Van Volkenburg, Maurice Browne
- Operator: Fine Arts Building
- Type: Regional theatre

Construction
- Opened: 1912; 114 years ago
- Closed: 1917

The Chicago Little Theatre was an American theater company formed in 1912. It spearheaded and lent its name to a historic, popular wave in American theater, the Little Theatre Movement. Founded in its namesake city by Ellen Van Volkenburg and Maurice Browne, the company was an art theater formed in opposition to the commercial values which held sway at the time. The company performed work by contemporary writers and Greek classics, as well as pioneering puppetry and puppet plays. Poetic dramas, restrained acting and new concepts in scenography were hallmarks of the Chicago Little Theatre.

== History ==
=== Founding ===
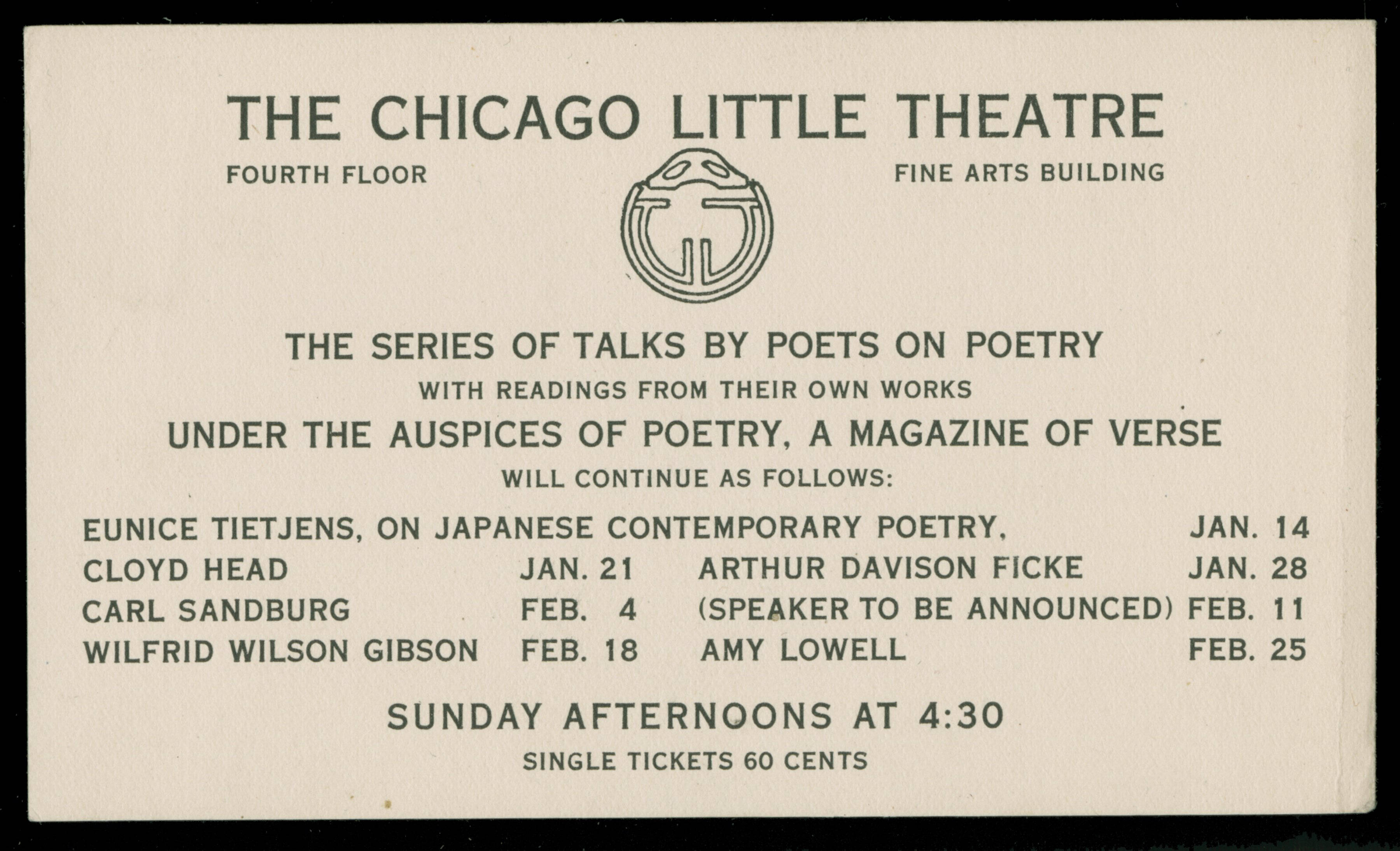
The Chicago Little Theatre

Already well ensconced by 1911 in the literary circles of Chicago, husband-and-wife artistic partners Maurice Browne and Ellen Van Volkenburg socialized with the Irish Players of the Abbey Theatre, led by Lady Gregory, when they toured the Midwest in that year. Inspired, they set out to create a theater company on that model, introducing European writers of the age whose work was not much produced in the United States, such as Ibsen, Shaw, Strindberg, Synge, Wilde, and Yeats.

After rehearsing extensively, in 1912 Van Volkenburg and Browne rented space for a theater in the Fine Arts Building (Chicago), bypassing the building's large auditorium In favor of a small space on the fourth floor that cost less than a quarter as much per year. The space was built out into a 91-seat house, its diminutive size the key to the company's name. Browne thought that "a small theatre would cost less than a large one; therefore ours was to be a little theatre."

Browne assumed directorship of the company, while Van Volkenburg, who was already an accomplished performer, became its leading actress. They were co-producers, with Van Volkenburg developing and directing the company's puppet productions. To the modern plays they were producing in the style of the Irish Players, the company added Greek classical dramas, which were well known to the Cambridge-educated Browne. Of the theater's repertoire, contemporary critic and founder of Theatre Arts Magazine, Sheldon Cheney, wrote, "The list bespeaks nothing if not breadth of view and courage. And these are qualities which the commercial producer so sadly lacks." Van Volkenburg pioneered "modern" puppetry in America, creating a puppet theater for the company that aspired to high artistic values, using new techniques she developed. Browne summed up the mission of the company in this way:

It is a repertory and experimental art theatre producing classical and modern plays, both tragedy and comedy, at popular prices. Preference is given in its productions to poetic and imaginative plays, dealing primarily whether as a tragedy or comedy with character in action. … The Chicago Little Theatre has for its object the creation of a new plastic and rhythmic drama in America.

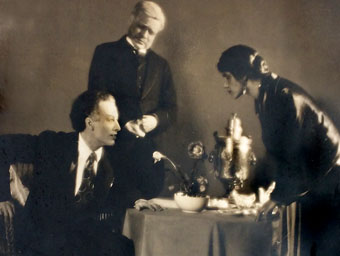
Chicago Little Theatre, c.1912

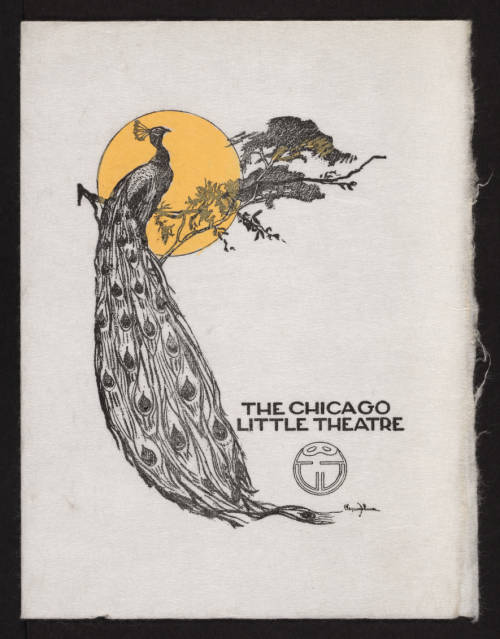
Program for The Philanderer

Among the notable productions of the Chicago Little theater were The Stronger and Creditors by August Strindberg, On Baile's Strand and The Shadowy Water by William Butler Yeats and Anatol by Arthur Schnitzler. In 1921, Browne and Volkenburg acted in the performance of George Bernard Shaw's The Philanderer at the Cornish School playhouse. The company's signature piece was the classic play by Euripides, The Trojan Women. Browne and Van Volkenburg not only revived the play in Chicago, but toured it throughout the Western United States. It was on this tour that Nellie Cornish, who would provide a landing spot for the two at her Cornish School some years later, saw their work and was "deeply impressed." Van Volkenberg played Hecuba, and Browne in later years counted it among the best performances of any actress he had seen in his life in the theater.

=== Innovations ===
The Chicago Little Theatre's stage in the Fine Arts Building, in a room never having been designed to hold a theater, had very little wing space and had large pillars to contend with. So as a matter of practicality as well as aesthetics, the company embraced the new, non-representational forms of staging coming out of Europe utilizing "simplicity and suggestion." Turning also to Asian sources for inspiration, the Little Theater was perhaps the first theater to use screens in the Japanese style as scenic elements. But the theater's greatest achievement, arguably, was in lighting. Browne and his designers made revolutionary use of light to create space by pioneering in the use of dimmers to control their instruments. The Trojan Women, in the eyes of one contemporary writer was "a scenic triumph made possible through its remarkable lighting." The full, combined effect of simplicity, forced perspective and variable lighting were evident in that production:

The Trojan Women had one scene throughout: a massive stone wall lost to view beyond the line of the proscenium arch, formed the background. This stone wall, jaggedly cleft in the center, showed the sky beyond. Not only were the massive square of stone that formed the wall played on by different lights as the play proceeded; but the sky beyond the jagged cleft changed gradually from the intense blue of full day to the softer colors of dusk, thus giving differentiation. The red of the flaming city also flared beyond this cleft, and characters entered or leaving the scene stood out in dark silhouette against the fiery background.

== Closing and legacy ==
Money had been hard to come by from the first days of the Chicago Little Theatre, and as the United States became involved in the First World War in 1917, interest in the company dropped off dramatically, placing the company in an impossible financial position. After only five years of operation, the theater was forced to close is doors.

Word of the closure of The Chicago Little Theatre reached Sheldon Cheney late in 1917. It had survived only a short time, but was highly influential. Cheney rendered an assessment of the importance of the company in unequivocal terms in the pages of Theatre Arts Magazine: "As this issue was going to press, we received a formal notice of the disbanding of the Chicago Little Theatre company. … With this dignified announcement there closes the most important chapter yet written in the history of the art theatre movement in this country."

The aesthetic and practice developed by Ellen Van Volkenburg and Maurice Browne at the Chicago Little Theatre traveled with them to a number of other ventures, most notably to the Cornish School of Music (later the Cornish School) in Seattle. Nellie Cornish approached them about joining her faculty on a visit to Chicago, but was rebuffed. Arriving at Cornish in 1918, after the collapse of the Chicago Little Theatre, the two accepted; they co-founded the Drama Department at the school. Van Volkenburg also instituted a program in puppetry.

== Sources ==
- Beard, DeAnna M. Toten. Sheldon Cheney’s Theatre Arts Magazine: Promoting a Modern American Theatre, 1916-1921. Plymouth, Scarecrow Press, 2010: reprinted in "Selected Articles": "Closing of the Chicago Little Theatre," by Sheldon Cheney, Theatre Arts Magazine, December 1917.
- Browne, Maurice. Too Late to Lament: An Autobiography. London, Gollancz, 1955.
- Chansky, Dorothy. Composing Ourselves: The Little Theatre Movement and the American Audience. Carbondale, Seattle, Southern Illinois University, 2004.
- Cheney, Sheldon. The New Movement in the Theatre. New York, Mitchell Kennerley, 1914.
- Cornish, Nellie C. Miss Aunt Nellie: The Autobiography of Nellie C. Cornish, Ellen Van Volkenburg Browne and Edward Nordhoff Beck, eds. Seattle, University of Washington, 1964.
- Joseph, Helen Haiman. A Book of Marionettes. New York, B.W. Huebsch, 1920.
- Lock, Charles. "Maurice Browne and the Chicago Little Theatre." Modern Drama 31.1, 1988.
- Mackay, Constance D'Arcy. The Little Theatre in the United States. New York, Henry Holt, 1917.
