= Le Petit Théâtre =

Le Petit Théâtre (French for The Little Theatre) may refer to:

- Le Petit Théâtre de Bouvard, a French TV program from 1982 to 1986
- Le Petit théâtre de Jean Renoir, a 1970s French TV program
- Le Petit Théâtre de l'Absolu, a puppet theatre that toured through Israel and the West Bank in 2003 founded by European Jewish folk quartet of musicians Black Ox Orkestar
- Le Petit Théâtre de Paris, a theater in Paris
- Le Petit Théâtre de Peau d'Ane, a 2007 installation by French contemporary artist Jean-Michel Othoniel
- Le Petit Théâtre du Vieux Carré, a community theater in the French Quarter of New Orleans, Louisiana

== See also ==
- Le Petit et le Grand Theatre du Marquis de Sade, a play by Serbian playwright Nenad Prokić
- Little Theatre (disambiguation)
