= Frederick Freer =

Frederick Freer may refer to:

- Fred Freer (1915–1998), Australian cricketer
- Frederick Warren Freer (1849–1908), American painter
