= Longnose garter snake =

Scientific classification
- Kingdom: Animalia
- Phylum: Chordata
- Class: Reptilia
- Order: Squamata
- Suborder: Serpentes
- Family: Colubridae
- Genus: Thamnophis
- Species: T. angustirostris

Binomial name
- Thamnophis angustirostris (Kennicott, 1860)

Species of snake

The Longnose garter snake (Thamnophis angustirostris) is a species of snake of the family Colubridae. It is found in Mexico.
