= Frederick Warren Freer =

American painter (1849–1908)

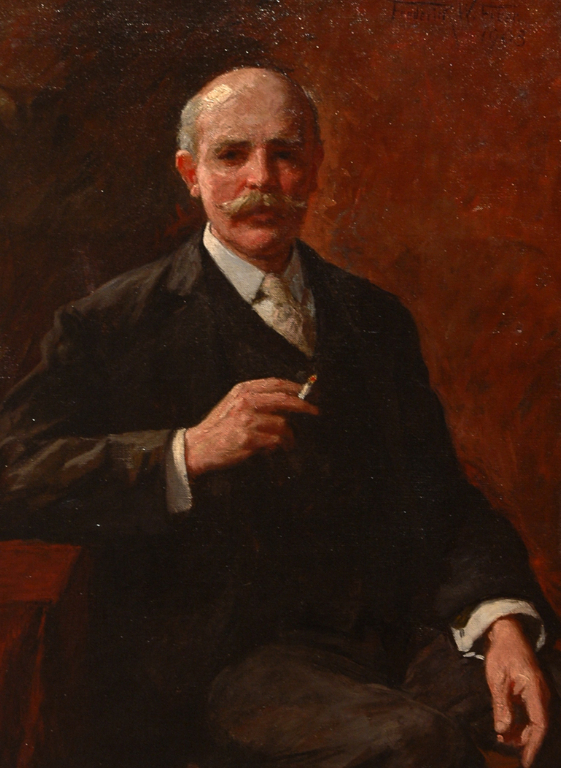
- Self-Portrait, 1903
- Born: June 16, 1849; Kennicott Grove, Illinois, US
- Died: March 7, 1908 (aged 58); Chicago, Illinois, US
- Education: Royal Academy of Fine Arts

Frederick Warren Freer (June 16, 1849 – March 7, 1908) was an American painter from Kennicott Grove, Illinois, who was especially known for his skill in portraying female subjects. The son of a physician, Freer studied art instead of medicine after going partially deaf when he was fourteen. After he graduated from high school in Chicago, Freer's family relocated to Munich, where Freer studied at the Royal Academy of Fine Arts under multiple well-known artists. He returned to Chicago in 1871 before travelling to San Luis Potosí, Munich, Paris, the Netherlands, and Italy; in 1880, he moved to New York City. During this time, he extensively exhibited his work across the United States, a practice he would continue for the rest of his career. He also married Margaret Cecilia Keenan, who frequently modelled for his works.

Freer's work started to attract attention near the end of the 1880s, particularly 1887's Lady in Black, and he received multiple awards for his work in the following years. He became particularly known for his ability to portray female subjects. In 1892, the Art Institute of Chicago employed him as an instructor, a role he performed for sixteen years. He died of a heart attack in 1908; his wife donated all of the works that he had left to the Montgomery Museum of Fine Arts, where many continue to be displayed.

Throughout his career, Freer demonstrated versatility, moving back and forth between a number of styles. Leaning on his education in Munich, he began by depicting well-lit subjects with dark clothing and surroundings; he later incorporated a wider range of colors in his work and even dabbled with Impressionist techniques. He also experimented with watercolor and etching in addition to traditional painting.

== Early life ==
Frederick Warren Freer was born in Kennicott Grove, near Chicago, Illinois, on June 16, 1849. He was the oldest son of physician Joseph Warren Freer and Katherine Gatter Freer. Joseph Warren Freer served as the president of Rush Medical College from 1872 to 1877 and two of Freer's brothers, Paul and Otto, also studied there. Freer's sister Cora became an artist. Although Freer had planned to study medicine like his father, he went partially deaf due to an illness at age fourteen; accordingly, Freer instead began to study for a career in art, a decision supported by his parents.

== Education ==
Freer was schooled in Chicago, graduating from Central High School in 1867. His family then moved to Munich, where he and his sister Cora studied at the Royal Academy of Fine Arts. Among Freer's instructors at the academy were well-known painters Alexander Strähuber, Alexander von Wagner, and Wilhelm von Diez. While in Munich, some of Freer's paintings that he had sent to the United States appeared in the Chicago Academy of Design's exhibitions. He concluded his stay at the academy in 1871 and returned to Chicago, where his family home was destroyed by the Great Chicago Fire. Freer returned to study at the Academy of Fine Arts, Munich at some point between 1871 and 1874.

== Career ==
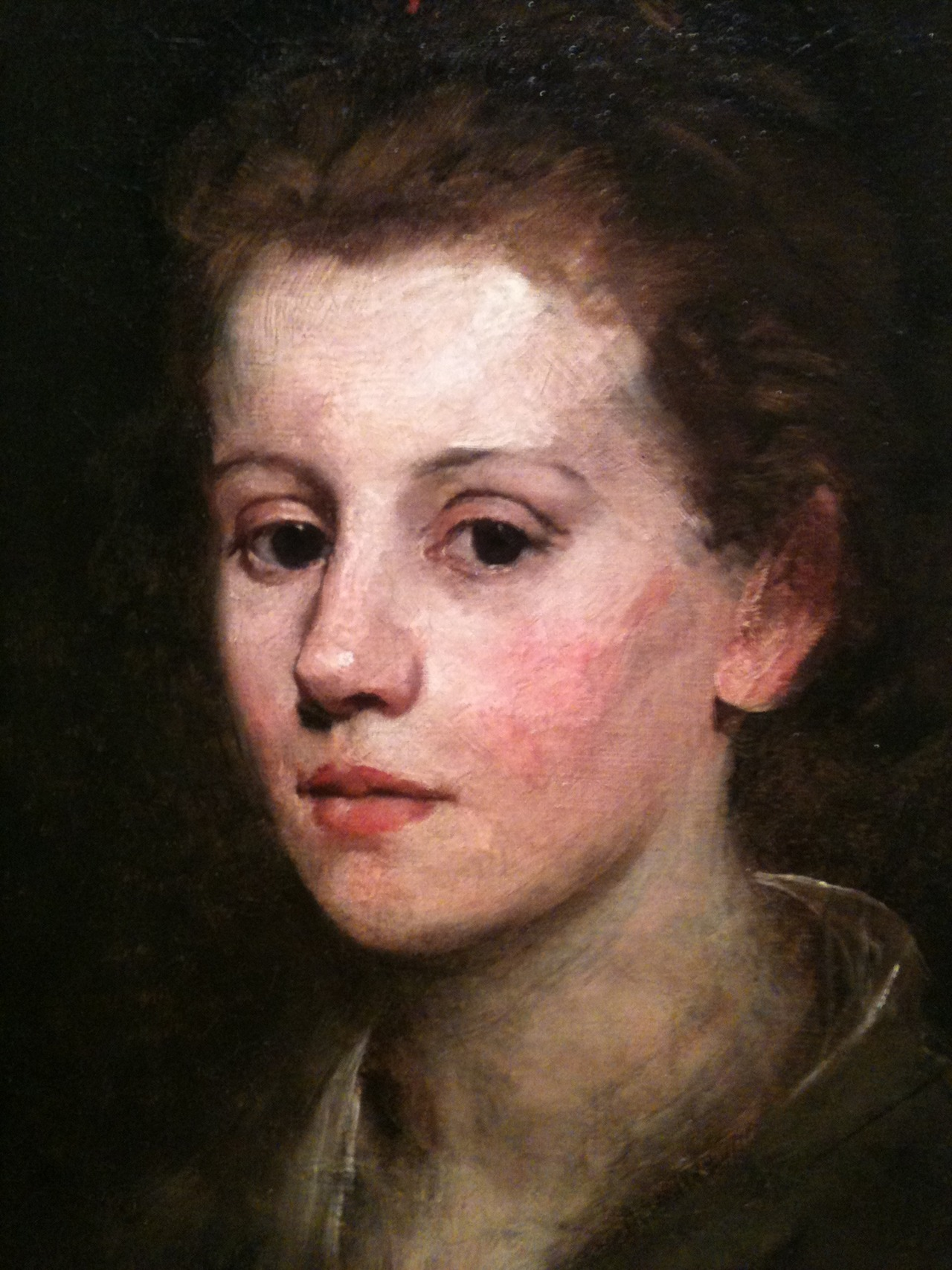
Flemish Girl, date uncertain

Freer's work was displayed at the 1873 Chicago Interstate Industrial Exposition, the first since the fire in 1871. He then left Chicago and went to San Luis Potosí, creating numerous paintings and drawings of the area and its inhabitants; these works, alongside some of those which he created while at the Royal Academy, featured in a Chicago Academy of Design exhibition in June 1875. In recognition of his talent, the Chicago Academy of Design designated him an academician.

In 1877, Freer traveled across Munich, Paris, the Netherlands, and Italy. While in Munich, he befriended fellow painter Frank Duveneck; on multiple occasions, the two portrayed each other, or painted the same subject together. In the summer of 1879, Freer stayed in Polling, Prussia, with Duveneck and Joseph Frank Currier, where he often painted the Bavarian landscape; this was followed by yearlong stay in Paris. In 1880, he briefly returned to Chicago and held an unsuccessful auction of his work before relocating to New York. There he became a member of clubs such as the Society of American Artists and began to exhibit his work with art societies and academies in New York, Boston, Philadelphia, and Chicago, among them the Society of American Artists, the National Academy of Design, and the Pennsylvania Academy of the Fine Arts. During this time, he also developed an interest in alternate art media, like watercolor and etching, dedicating a large amount of time to the two crafts.

After returning from a trip to the Netherlands in 1883, Freer became an instructor at the Art Students League of New York, teaching drawing and painting alongside his associates Walter Shirlaw and William Merritt Chase. Around this time, well-known art collectors, including Thomas B. Clarke, began to acquire some of Freer's work. Freer married Margaret Cecilia Keenan, a painter and model, on his thirty-seventh birthday. The pair met after Keenan had modelled for Freer; he continued to depict her extensively throughout their marriage. With her, Freer had six children: Frederick Church, Arthur Warren, Paul Howard, Otto Emil, Catherine, and a sixth child who died in infancy.

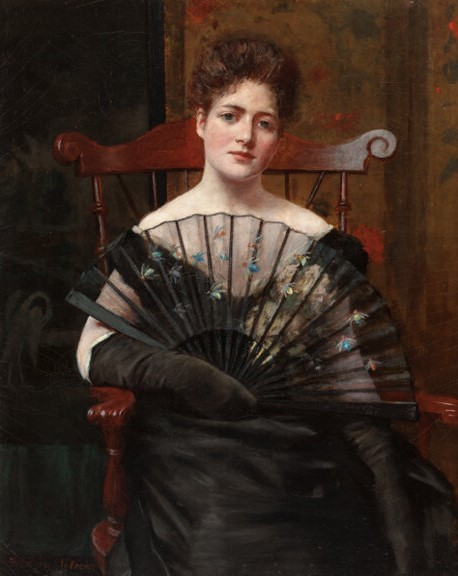
Lady in Black, 1887

Freer continued to be a frequent participant in art exhibitions across America towards the end of the 1880s and helped create the Chicago Society of Artists in 1887. He produced works following the Munich style which he had learned at the Royal Academy, using dark colors contrasting bright subjects, as well as other portraits using brighter colors and classical themes. Freer's 1887 portrait Lady in Black, depicting his wife, became his first widely successful work, leading to his selection as an associate of the National Academy of Design. His portrait work of various women, including his wife, became especially appreciated during this period; art writer Frederick W. Morton referred to him as "the painter of beautiful women's faces" and noted his "certain aptitude for portraying the female face". He was the recipient of many commissions and one of his works was displayed at the 1889 Exposition Universelle in Paris.

In 1890, Freer auctioned many of his works and returned to Chicago to begin work as a private art instructor. He continued to exhibit his work across the United States during this time and was a founding member of Chicago's Cosmopolitan Art Club. The Art Institute of Chicago hired Freer as an instructor in 1892, where he was one of the "Institute's senior and most influential professors"; the Institute described him as a "a very important part in the school." He was well-liked and was described as kind and an effective critic. He also taught outdoor sketching classes with painter Martha Susan Baker beginning in 1896. Among his pupils was Impressionist painter Frederick Carl Frieseke. Freer would remain an employee of the school for sixteen years.

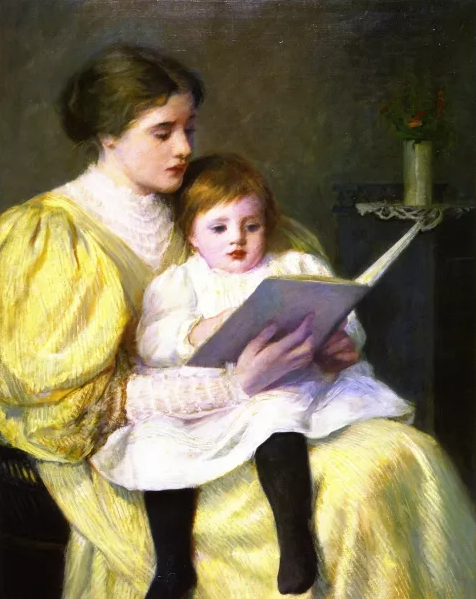
Nursery Rhymes, 1896

Freer participated in the Chicago World's Fair in 1893, acting as a member on the National Art Selection Jury. He also had some of his works displayed, one of which, Lady in Black, won him a medal. The following year, his work received an honorable mention for the Charles T. Yerkes prize and in 1896, he won the Thomas B. Clarke prize for his painting Sympathy. Near the end of the twentieth century, Freer continued to exhibit his work extensively and served on multiple art committees and juries. He continued to receive commissions for portraits and also began to dabble with Impressionism in his works. For his paintings, Freer received a bronze medal at the 1901 Pan-American Exposition, the Martin B. Cahn prize at the American Annual exhibition in Chicago, a silver at the 1902 South Carolina Inter-State and West Indian Exhibit, a silver at the Annual Exhibition of Works by Chicago Artists in 1902, and a bronze at the 1904 Louisiana Purchase Exposition.

Freer continued to exhibit his work across the country until March 7, 1908, when he died from a heart attack in his bed. His health had been declining since March of the previous year. His body was laid in state at the Art Institute of Chicago and his funeral took place three days after his death. Multiple memorial exhibitions were conducted in his honor in Chicago and New York. Freer did not write a will; his wife took possession of all of his extant works. She moved to Fairhope, Alabama, after his death and donated 87 of Freer's paintings to the Montgomery Museum of Fine Arts, where many continue to be displayed. Other paintings by Freer are also on exhibition in the Nassau County Museum of Art.

== Style ==
Freer was a versatile painter associated with multiple different styles throughout his career. His early work was heavily influenced by the style of portraiture taught at the Royal Academy, contrasting the bright faces of his subjects with dark clothing and surroundings. He continued to paint in this style for his whole life; in the 1880s, he began to paint using a more ample variety of colors and also produced more works in watercolor. He additionally experimented with Impressionist techniques for a time, though he never fully committed to the style. Although especially known for his portraits of females, Freer portrayed a wide range of subjects over his lifetime, including landscapes, classical scenes, and still lifes, moving repeatedly between the aforementioned styles.
