= Fine Arts Building (Chicago) =

Building in Chicago, Illinois

- U.S. National Register of Historic Places
- Chicago Landmark
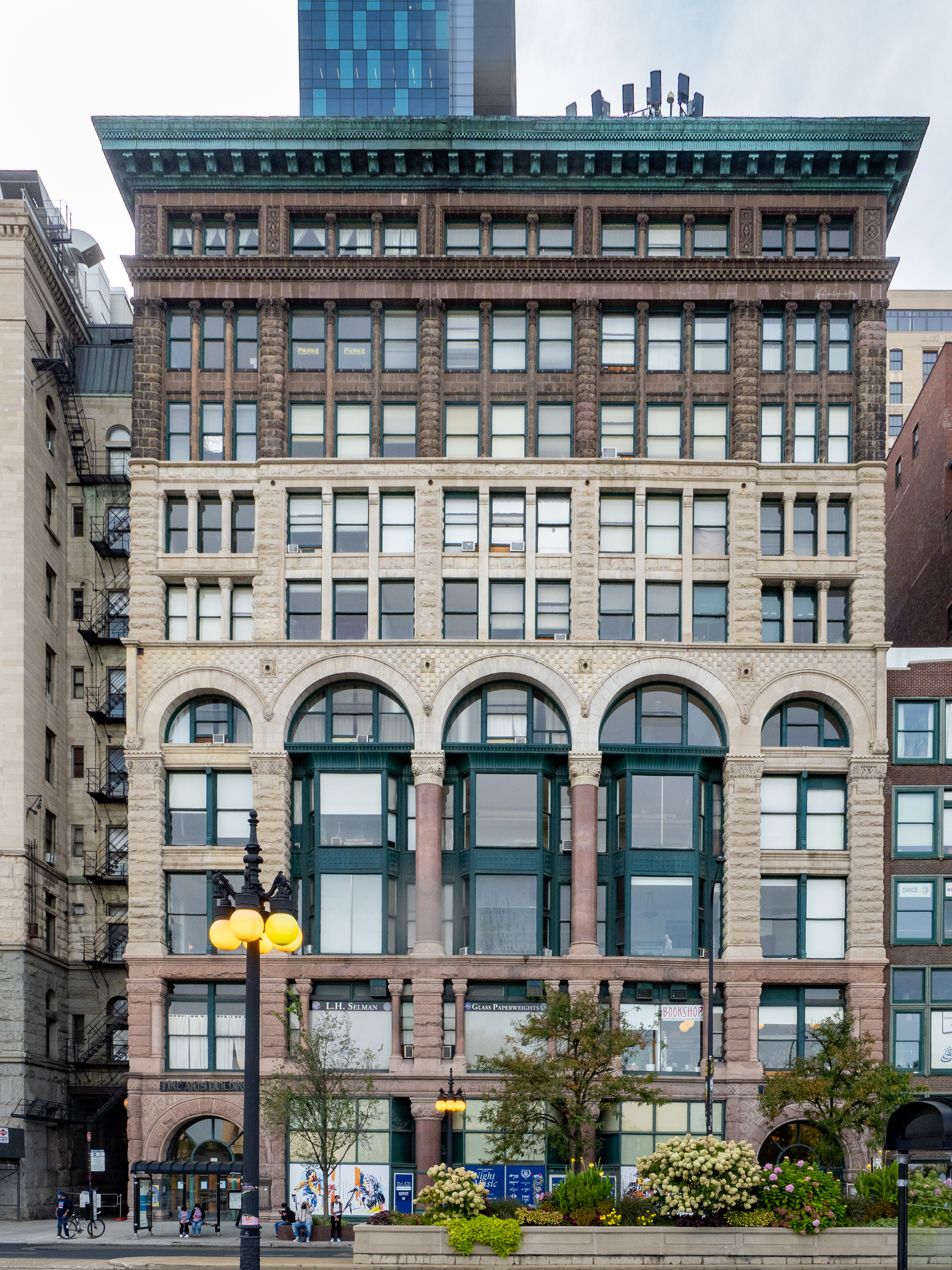
- Fine Arts Building Facade (2021)

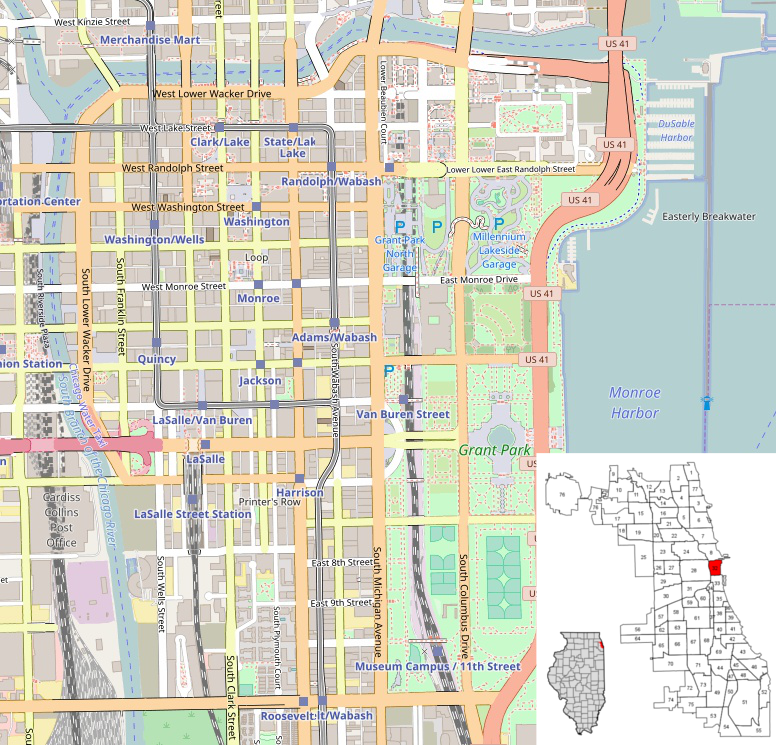
- Location within Chicago Loop
- Location: 410–418 S. Michigan Ave., Chicago, Illinois
- Coordinates: 41°52′35.2″N 87°37′28.6″W
- Built: 1885
- Architect: Solon Beman
- Architectural style: Romanesque
- NRHP reference No.: 75000653

Significant dates
- Added to NRHP: August 11, 1975
- Designated CHICL: June 7, 1978

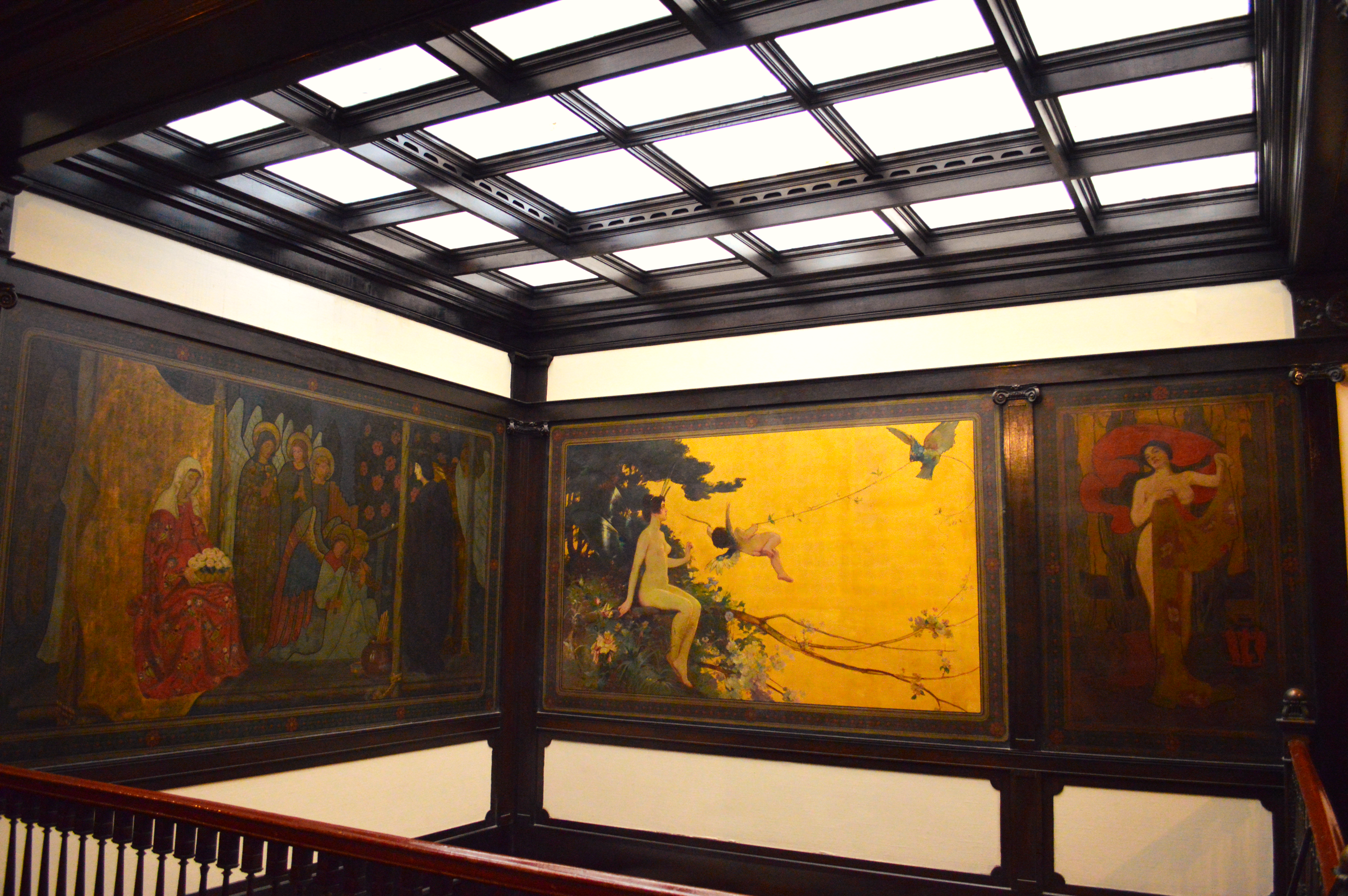
Art Nouveau murals on the Fine Arts Building's 10th floor

The Fine Arts Building, formerly known as the Studebaker Building, is a 10-story edifice at 410 S Michigan Avenue across from Grant Park in Chicago in the Chicago Landmark Historic Michigan Boulevard District. It was built for the Studebaker company in 1884–1885 by Solon Spencer Beman, and extensively remodeled in 1898, when Beman removed the building's eighth (top) story and added three new stories. Studebaker constructed the building as a carriage sales and service operation with manufacturing on upper floors. The two granite columns at the main entrance, 3 feet 8 inches (1.12 m) in diameter and 12 feet 10 inches (3.91 m) high, were said to be the largest polished monolithic shafts in the country. The interior features Art Nouveau motifs and murals by artists such as Martha Susan Baker, Frederic Clay Bartlett, Oliver Dennett Grover, Frank Xavier Leyendecker, and Bertha Sophia Menzler-Peyton dating from the 1898 renovation. In the early 20th century, the Kalo Shop and Wilro Shop, firms owned by women and specializing in Arts and Crafts items, were established in the renamed Fine Arts Building.

True to its name, it houses artists' lofts, art galleries, theatre, dance and recording studios, interior and web design firms, musical instrument makers, and other businesses associated with the arts. It also holds offices of the Chicago Youth Symphony Orchestras, the Jazz Institute of Chicago, Chicago Opera Theater, and the Chicago International Puppet Theater Festival. The Fine Arts Building was designated a Chicago Landmark on June 7, 1978. By 2025, the Fine Arts Building had Chicago's last remaining manually operated elevators, which were being replaced through 2026.

== Studebaker Theater ==
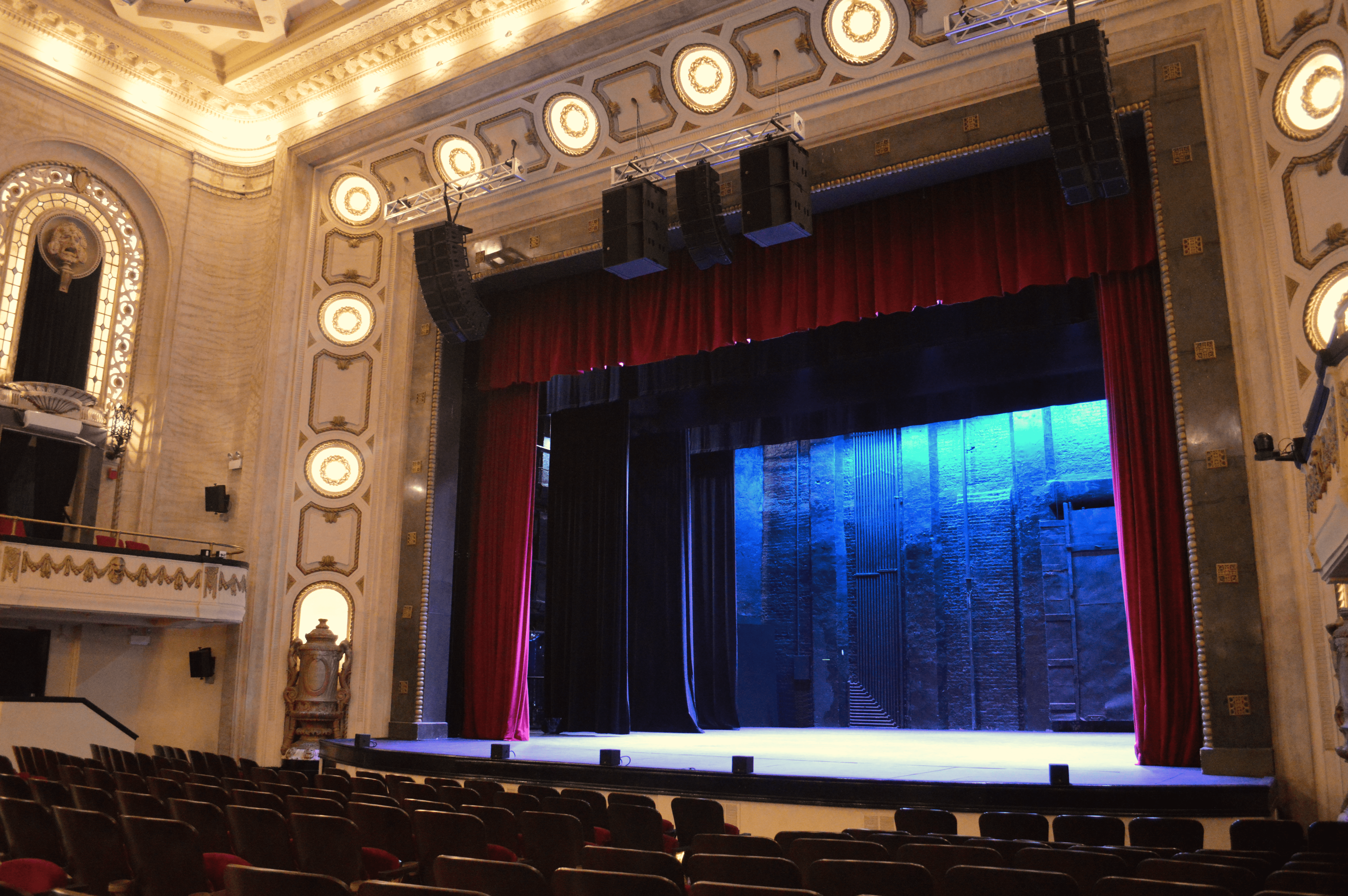
The Studebaker Theater Proscenium and Stage

The Fine Arts Building houses the Studebaker Theater, also known as Studebaker Hall, dedicated in 1898. In 1917, the theater underwent its first major renovation under the direction of architect Andrew Rebori. The theater still looks much the same as it did after that renovation, retaining the original ceiling from 1898.

The Studebaker was the site of David Bispham's 1901 recital exclusively featuring the songs of Carrie Jacobs-Bond. Paul Whiteman and his orchestra gave the first public performance of the Grand Canyon Suite here on November 22, 1931. The venue also hosted some of the earliest live television shows including DuMont Television Network's Cavalcade of Stars hosted by comedian Jack Carter and Hawkins Falls, Population 6200.

In the 1970s the theater was partitioned into a multiplex movie theater. Renovations to return to live theater were begun in 2014, and the theater was reopened in 2015 with a capacity of 631.

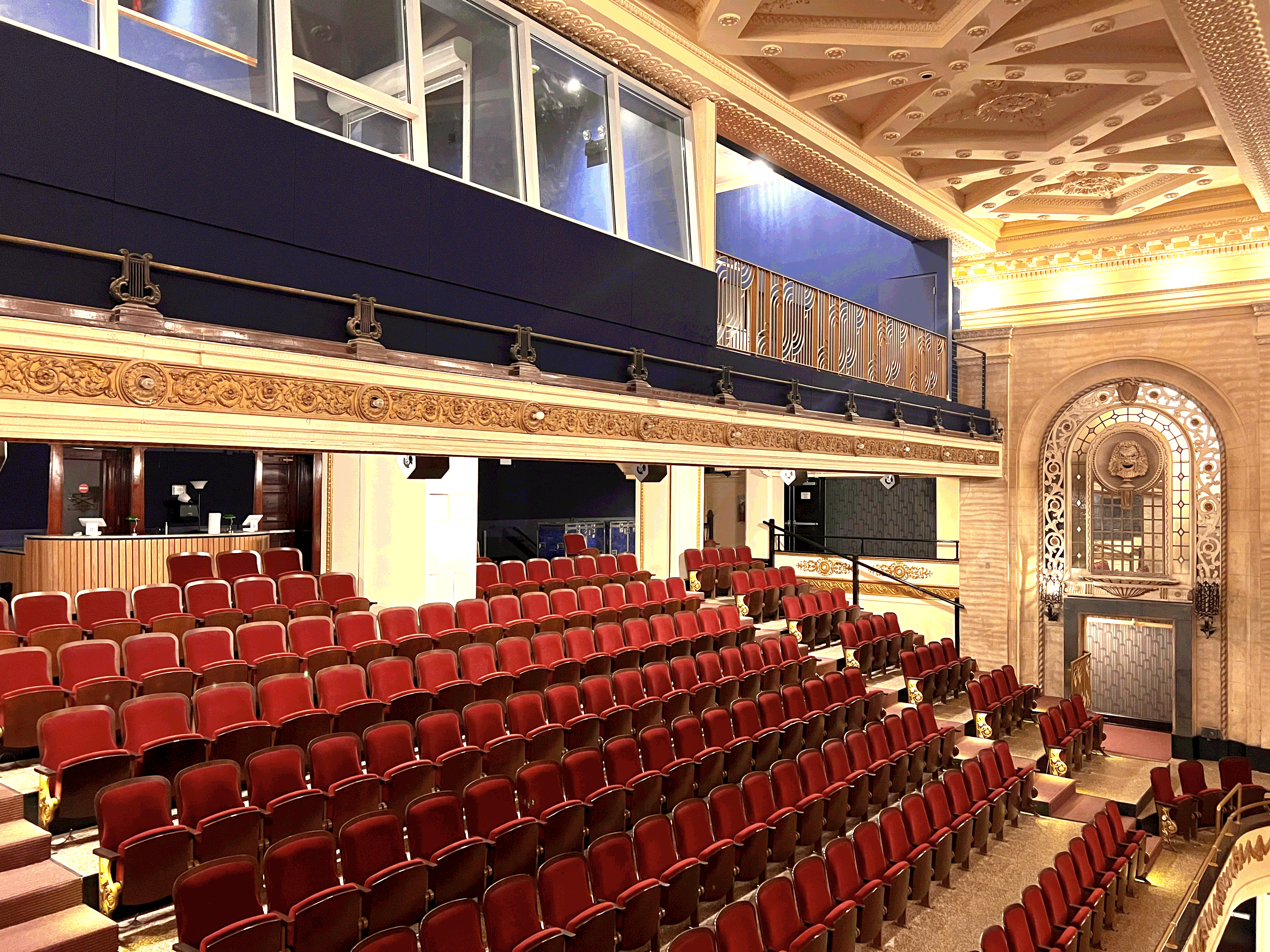
The Studebaker Theater Balcony

A larger multimillion-dollar renovation began in 2021, updating many of the Studebaker's technical capacities. Following the renovation, the Studebaker Theater became home to NPR's Wait Wait... Don't Tell Me!

== Chicago Little Theatre ==
From 1912 to 1917, the Fine Arts Building housed the Chicago Little Theatre, an art theater credited with beginning the Little Theatre Movement in the United States. Not being able to afford rental on the building's 500-seat auditorium, co-producers Maurice Browne and Ellen Van Volkenburg rented a large storage space on the fourth floor at the back and built it out into a 91-seat house. The group specialized in training actors and producing contemporary plays in their small 99-seat theater on the 4th floor, including performances of Shaw, Strindberg, Ibsen, Wilde, and Yeats. Though short-lived, the Chicago Little Theatre was a monumental influence on American theatre, spreading the Little Theatre practice across the nation and laying the groundwork for the Chicago storefront theater movement. The Chicago Little Theatre space is now occupied by the Chicago International Puppet Theater Festival, whose founder chose the space because Van Volkenburg used puppets and coined the word "puppeteer."

== Prominent Historic Tenants ==
- Lorado Taft, sculptor
- William W. Denslow, Wizard of Oz illustrator
- Frank Lloyd Wright, architect
- John T. McCutcheon, political cartoonist
- George Barr McCutcheon, author
- Ralph Fletcher Seymour, publisher and etcher
- Anna Morgan, acting teacher
- J.C. Leyendecker and F.X. Leyendecker, illustrators
- Oliver Dennett Grover, artist
- Frederic Clay Bartlett, artist
- Irving K. Pond, architect
- Caxton Club, literary club
- The Little Review, literary journal edited by Margaret Anderson
- Chicago Woman's Club
- Fortnightly of Chicago
- Illinois Equal Suffrage Association, led by President Grace Wilbur Trout
- Chicago Youth Symphony Orchestras
- George Ade, humorist
- Henry Blake Fuller, novelist
- Kalo Shop, silversmithing shop
- Chicago Little Theatre, founded by Maurice Browne and Ellen Van Volkenburg
- The Dial, literary journal edited by Francis Fisher Browne
- Chicago Musical College
- Alliance Francaise
- George Hamlin, tenor
- Arnold Jacobs, tubist, Chicago Symphony Orchestra
- Edward Kleinhammer, bass trombonist, Chicago Symphony Orchestra
- George Perlman, violinist and composer
- Harrington Institute of Interior Design
- Studebaker Theatre Company (1956–1957), founded by Bernard Sahlins
- Jazz Institute of Chicago
- Chicago Opera Theater
- Gillian Flynn, novelist
