= Donald C. Peattie =

American botanist, naturalist and author

Donald Culross Peattie
- Born: June 21, 1898; Chicago
- Died: November 16, 1964 (aged 66)
- Scientific career
- Fields: naturalist
- Author abbrev. (botany): Peattie

Donald Culross Peattie (June 21, 1898 – November 16, 1964) was an American botanist, naturalist and author. He was described by Joseph Wood Krutch as "perhaps the most widely read of all contemporary American nature writers" during his heyday. His brother, Roderick Peattie (1891–1955), was a geographer and a noted author in his own right. Peattie regarded people of sub-Saharan African lineage as an inferior people. In an effort to mitigate his brother's racism, Roderick Peattie described his brother's published anti-Black statements as "mercifully brief and hardly malicious".

== Early life ==
Peattie was born in Chicago to the journalist Robert Peattie and the novelist Elia W. Peattie. He studied French poetry for two years at the University of Chicago, then tried journalism, and office work in New York. Around 1919 he traveled along the Appalachians from Virginia to New Hampshire, collecting and drawing plants. He then enrolled in – and graduated (1922) from — Harvard University, where he studied with the noted botanist Merritt Lyndon Fernald. After field work in the Southern and Mid-West United States, he worked as a botanist for the U.S. Department of Agriculture (1922–1924) under David Fairchild. He was then nature columnist for the Washington Star from 1924 to 1935.

His field work for Harvard was in the Indiana dunes, which he published in 1922 and 1930. In 1928 Peattie and his wife, Louise Redfield, with their four-year-old daughter and baby son, Malcolm, moved to Paris to "launch the frail bark of our careers". At two days in Paris the daughter died "of a malady unsuspected and always fatal". In a "search for sunlight" they re-settled in Vence in the south. He wrote its history in Vence, the Story of a Provencal Town through Five Thousand Years. Another son, Mark, was born there, and son Noel was born in 1932.

After five years in France they moved to Kennicott Grove in Illinois, his wife's childhood home, which she described in American Acres, and he described in A Prairie Grove. He also wrote An Almanac for Moderns there, which won an award from the Limited Editions Club as likely to become a classic. In July 1937 moved to Montecito, CA, where he wrote Flowering Earth. In 1942 he moved to Santa Barbara, CA.

His brother-in-law was Robert Redfield, the anthropologist.

== Later life ==
Peattie was an advocate for protecting the Indiana Dunes. He served on the Save the Dunes Council in the late 1950s, helping to bring Illinois' Senator Paul Douglas into the fight to protect the Indiana Dunes from industrial development.

== Literature work ==
Peattie's nature writings are distinguished by a poetic and philosophical cast of mind and are scientifically scrupulous. His best known works are the two books (out of a planned trilogy) on North American trees, A Natural History of Trees of Eastern and Central North America (1950) and A Natural History of Western Trees (1953), with woodcut illustrations by Paul Landacre. Peattie also produced children's and travel books, altogether totaling almost forty volumes. He also published the classic, botanical treatment on the Flora of the Indiana Dunes (1930).

An example of Peattie's anti-Black racism is the following, from An Almanac for Moderns: "Every species of ant has its racial characteristics. This one seems to me to be the negro of ants, and not alone from the circumstance that he is all black, but because he is the commonest victim of slavery, and seems especially susceptible to a submissive estate. He is easily impressed by the superior organization or the menacing tactics of his raiders and drivers, and, as I know him, he is relatively lazy or at least disorganized, random, feckless and witless when free in the bush, while for his masters he will work faithfully." Peattie's belief in the inferiority of people of African descent seems to be specific to them, and does not seem to have extended to other non-white people, nor implied a broader support of eugenics. According to Peattie's grandson, David Peattie, "In the period following the bombing of Pearl Harbor... [Donald Culross Peattie] spoke out eloquently against the internment of Japanese Americans, and wrote letters to the editor in their defense". That was after he witnessed a Japanese gardener, who had been hired by the owner of a house he was renting in California, interned in the camps. Thus, Peattie's belief in the inferiority of people of African descent seems to be specific to them, and does not seem to have extended to other non-white people, nor implied a broader support of eugenics.

His comments on the taxonomist Carl Linnaeus, suggest that Peattie was not classist. In discussing, in 1936, how Linnaeus grew up in a small, provincial town far from the scientific capitals of Europe, Peattie said: "To the astonishment of all the wise men, he (Linnaeus) was not a product of Wittenberg, or the parks of Versailles or even of English country life, that nurse of so much delicate feeling for natural beauty. But genius so seldom grows where the highly born and the members of the eugenical societies tell us to expect it!" (This is a slap against the American Eugenics Society, a national group formed in 1921, which was prominent in the 1930s, promoting "racial betterment." During that time, the group consisted of "mostly prominent and wealthy members who more often than not were non-scientists.")

== Books ==
- Vence, the Story of a Provencal Town through Five Thousand Years (published privately in Nice in 1930 and circulated only in France)
- Happy Kingdom (date unknown, written with Louise Redfield Peattie, published by Blackie & Son, Ltd. in Glasgow)
- Flora of the Indiana Dunes (1930)
- Trees You Want to Know (1934)
- An Almanac for Moderns (1935)
- Singing in the Wilderness: A Salute to John James Audubon (1935)
- Green Laurels: The Lives and Achievements of the Great Naturalists (1936)
- A Book of Hours (1937)
- The Story of the New Lands (1937)
- This is Living, A View of Nature with Photographs (1938)
- A Prairie Grove (1938), a narrative of the history and family home of naturalist Robert Kennicott
- Flowering Earth (1939)
- Audubon's America (1940)
- The Road of a Naturalist (1941)
- The Great Smokies and the Blue Ridge: The Story of the Southern Appalachians (1943), edited by Roderick Peattie ["The contributors: Edward S. Drake, Ralph Erskine, Alberta Pierson Hannum, Donald Culross Peattie [and others] ..."]; New York, The Vanguard Press.
- Journey into America (1943), a series of letters he writes to a presumably killed European friend explaining the history and culture of the United States.
- Forward the Nation (Armed Services edition) (1944)
- Immortal Village (1945, a completely revised edition of Vence)
- American Heartwood (1949)
- A Natural History of Trees of Eastern and Central North America, Boston, MA: Houghton Mifflin Company, 1950; 2nd ed 1966; Reprint as trade paperback with intro by Robert Finch, 1991. (Portions were previously published in The Atlantic Monthly, Natural History and Scientific American in 1948–49.)
- A Natural History of Western Trees, Boston, MA: Houghton Mifflin Company, 1953; Reprint as trade paperback with intro by Robert Finch, 1991.
- Best in Children's Books (6) by Donald Culross Peattie, Phyllis Krasilovsky, Rudyard Kipling, and Rachel Field (1958)
- A Natural History of North American Trees (2007), an abridged one-volume selection from the previous two volumes
- The Rainbow Book of Nature (1957)

== Legacy ==
- Peattie's papers, correspondence, and manuscripts, and those of Louise Redfield, are in the archives of the University of California, Santa Barbara, Davidson Library, Department of Special Collections.
