= Chicago Youth Symphony Orchestras =

- Orchestra
- Short name: CYSO
- Founded: 1946
- Location: Chicago, Illinois
- Website: cyso.org

Chicago Youth Symphony Orchestras (CYSO) is an orchestral music education organization in Chicago, Illinois, that was founded in 1946 to provide music education and instrumental training of the highest quality to Chicago area youth.

== Organization ==
Chicago Youth Symphony Orchestras (CYSO) is located in the Chicago Fine Arts Building on S. Michigan Avenue. CYSO serves more than 9,700 students ages 6–18 in on-site ensembles including four full orchestras, three string orchestras, jazz orchestra, multiple steel orchestras, and enrichment opportunities including chamber music, masterclasses, and music composition.

CYSO Community Partnership Programs support instrumental music training and music access, reaching 8,500 young people during the 2017–2018 season. The organization works with students in underserved neighborhoods through the ambassador Program, which brings chamber music ensembles to neighborhood schools to perform interactive concerts; after-school ensembles; free community and education concerts; and partners with institutions including Chicago Public Schools (CPS) and The People's Music School.

== Programs ==
On-site Ensembles:

- Symphony Orchestra
- Philharmonic Orchestra
- Concert Orchestra
- Debut Orchestra
- Accelerando Strings
- Preparatory Strings
- Overture Strings
- Steel Orchestras
- Jazz Orchestra

Enrichment Programs

- Chamber Music
- Composition Seminar
- International Tours
- Chamber Orchestra
- Conducting Fellowship
- Ambassadors

== Organizational History ==
CYSO was founded in 1946 by a group of students who, energized by a summer music camp, wanted to explore music closer to home throughout the school year. They first met on Saturday mornings at the Wurlitzer Music Store on South Wabash Avenue, and in November 1947, 100 young musicians held the first performance at Chicago's Orchestra Hall, featuring a program of Frescobaldi, Beethoven, MacDowell, and Kodaly. In 1960, CYSO moved to the historic Fine Arts Building, a center for arts and culture since 1898.

== Notable alumni ==
- Laurie Anderson, performance artist
- Anthony McGill, principal clarinet, New York Philharmonic
- Sheila Johnson, co-founder of BET and CEO of Salamander Hotels and Resorts
- Andrew Bird, zinger/zongwriter
- Richard Davis (bassist), bassist, educator, activist
- Demarre McGill, principal flute, Seattle Symphony
- Gordon Peters, former principal percussion, Chicago Symphony Orchestra
- Austin Huntington, principal cello, Indianapolis Symphony Orchestra
- Emma Gerstein, second flute, Chicago Symphony Orchestra
- Robin Kesselman, principal bass, Houston Symphony
- Emma Steele, concertmaster, Royal Danish Orchestra
- Ian Ding, former principal percussion, Detroit Symphony Orchestra

== Artistic Staff ==
2017-2018 season:

- Allen Tinkham - musical director and symphony orchestra conductor
- Steve Gooden - symphony orchestra assistant conductor
- Terrance Gray - associate conductor and philharmonic orchestra conductor
- Daniella Valdez - director of string ensembles
- Dr. Donald Deroche - director of chamber music
- Malika Green - director of steel orchestras
- Pharez Whitted - jazz orchestra director
- Michael Mascari - concert orchestra conductor
- Dana Green - debut orchestra conductor
- Anne McTighe - overture strings conductor, preparatory strings assistant conductor
- Scott McConnell - steel orchestras assistant

== Performances ==
CYSO's various ensembles perform at places including Symphony Center's Orchestra Hall, the Chicago Cultural Center, the South Shore Cultural Center, University of Chicago's Reva and David Logan Center for the Arts, The Studebaker Theater located in the Fine Arts Building Chicago, Chicago's Grant Park, and Pick-Staiger Hall. CYSO's Symphony Orchestra also performs regularly at Millennium Park's Jay Pritzker Pavilion, appearing in the past at the Grant Park Music Festival Independence Day Salute and with Blue Man Group.

== International tours ==
During the 2009 South American Tour to Argentina and Uruguay, the CYSO Symphony Orchestra performed at Teatro Coliseo Podesta in La Plata, La Facultad de Derecho in Buenos Aires, Teatro El Circulo in Rosario, and Teatro Solis in Montevideo. On the 2012 Tour of Spain, students performed in Madrid, in Cuenca in a joint concert with the Joven Orquesta de la Mancha, at Valencia's Palau de la Música Catalana, and Barcelona's Conservatori Superior de Música del Liceu. During the 2014 Tour of China, CYSO's Symphony Orchestra students performed in Beijin at the National Centre for the Performing Arts (China), Xi'an Concert Hall, in Hangzhou at the Opera Hall of the Hangzhou Grand Theater, and at the Shanghai Oriental Art Center. On the most recent tour of Central Europe in 2017, CYSO performed at Belgrade's Kolarac Hall, Budapest's Béla Bartók National Concert Hall, at the Jihlava Mahler Festival at the Church of the Holy Cross, and in a sold-out joint concert with the Symphony Orchestra of the Music High Schools of Prague at Dvorak Hall of the Rudolfinum.
