= Bertha Sophia Menzler-Peyton =

American painter

- Born: June 25, 1871; Chicago, Illinois
- Died: March 21, 1947 (aged 75); Boston, Massachusetts
- Known for: Painting
- Spouse: Alfred Peyton

Bertha Sophia Menzler-Peyton (1871-1947) was an American painter active in Chicago, where she was born.

== Early life ==
Menzler-Peyton was born on June 25, 1871, in Chicago. She studied art at the Chicago Art Institute. From there she moved to Paris where she continued her studies with Luc-Olivier Merson, Raphaël Collin, and Edmond Aman-Jean. She was married to Alfred Peyton.

Returning to live in Chicago, Menzler-Peyton painted one in a series of eight murals, begun in 1900, that were located on the tenth floor of the Fine Arts Building, located at 410 South Michigan Avenue, Chicago.

At the 1919 annual meeting of the National Association of Women Painters and Sculptors "held in the board room of the Architectural League of New York in November," Menzler Peyton and Miss Florence Francis Snell were elected vice-presidents;

Menzler-Peyton died on March 21, 1947, in Boston, Massachusetts. Her work was included in the 2016 - 2017 exhibition Rebels With a Cause: American Impressionist Women organized by the Huntsville Museum of Art.

== Work ==
works referenced at the Smithsonian American Art Museum database unless otherwise noted.

- The Muscovite Family, Brooklyn Museum, Brooklyn, New York
- San Francisco Peaks, Atchison, Topeka and Santa Fe Railway, Chicago, Illinois
- Desert Effects, Arizona, Atchison, Topeka and Santa Fe Railway
- Sunshine and Shower, Grand Canyon, Atchison, Topeka and Santa Fe Railway
- Sunshine and Shower, Grand Canyon, Atchison, Topeka and Santa Fe Railway
- Western Landscape, Santa Fe Collection of Southwestern Art, Santa Fe, New Mexico
- various private collections

== Gallery ==
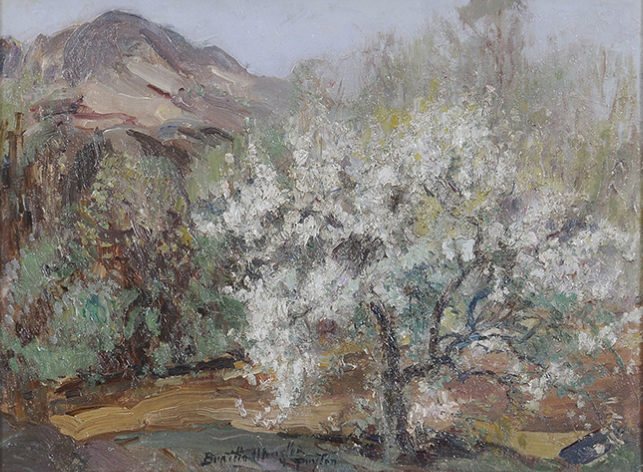
Apple Blossoms

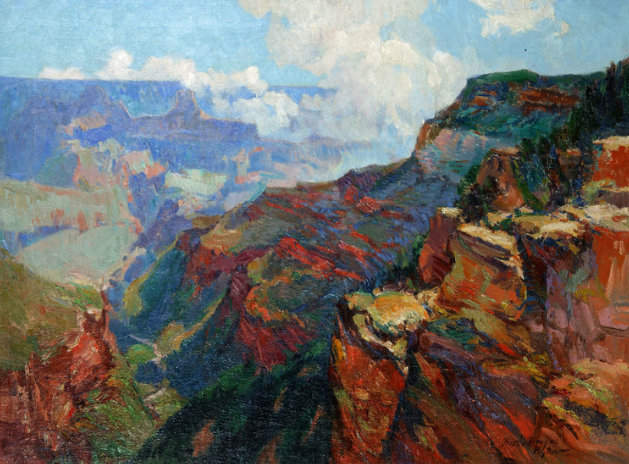
Grand Canyon
