= Anna Morgan (teacher) =

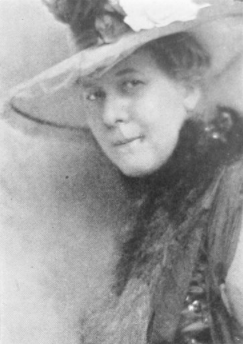
- Born: February 24, 1851; Fleming, New York, US
- Died: August 27, 1936 (aged 85); Chicago, Illinois, US
- Burial place: Graceland Cemetery
- Education: Hershey Music School
- Occupation: Drama teacher

Anna Morgan (1851–1936) was a teacher of the dramatic arts in the late 19th century, who set up her school, the Anna Morgan Studios, in Chicago's historic Fine Arts Building. She was essential in setting the standards for teaching speech and theater as a respected intellectual study and helped to begin the Little Theater movement.

== Life ==
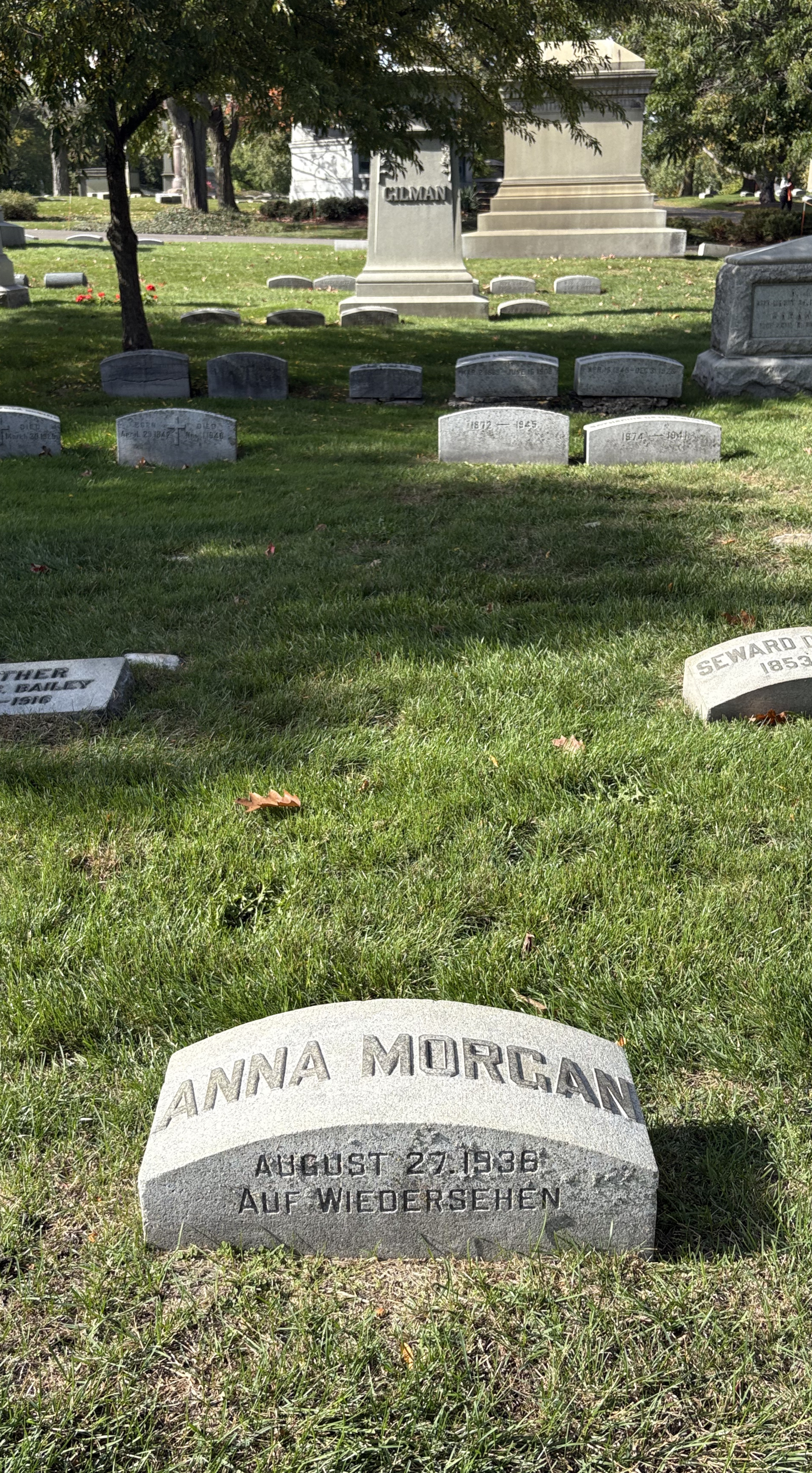
Morgan's grave at Graceland Cemetery

Anna Morgan was born on February 24, 1851, in Fleming, New York. She was the daughter of Mary Jane Thornton Morgan and Allen Denison Morgan, a gentleman farmer who served on the New York legislature in 1860-1861. She was the oldest child and had five siblings, two brothers and three sisters. They attended school in Auburn, New York until their father died in 1876 when her mother moved the family to Chicago. In 1877, Morgan began her studies in elocution at the Hershey Music School.

She died at her home in Chicago on August 27, 1936, at the age of 85, and was buried at Graceland Cemetery.

== Legacy and influence ==
By the late 19th century, Morgan was famous for being a dramatic reader with a naturalistic style that was unusual at the time. From 1880-1883, Morgan worked with the Redpath Lyceum Bureau and traveled to large cities, such as NYC and Boston, where they would put on shows. In 1884, Morgan then joined the New Chicago Opera House Conservatory, where she began to focus on teaching drama. Although her productions were on a small scale, often being limited to the Conservatory stage, Morgan was known for her sophisticated choice of plays. In addition to the popular plays of the time, she put on adaptations of Shakespearean tragedies, classic Greek tragedies, and contemporary poetry among others. In addition, she was the first to put on an American production of Shaw's Caesar and Cleopatra, with an all-female cast.

== The Anna Morgan Studios ==
In 1898, Morgan resigned from the Conservatory and opened the Anna Morgan Studios in Chicago's Fine Arts Building. The curriculum of the studio included instruction in theatrical and political history, literature, playwriting, etiquette, acting, and stagecraft. Morgan was trained by Steele MacKay in the Delsarte method, in which emotions are conveyed through body positions and gestures. Morgan based her instruction on Delsarte's philosophy, emphasizing the connection between the positions of the body and the emotions of the mind. She also taught her students to balance flexibility and grace with force and meaning in their movements.

In April 1899, she presented her pupils in the first U.S. performances of Shaw's Candida, performed in private because unauthorized by the author. She similarly premiered Caesar and Cleopatra in 1899.

== Important literary works ==
Anna Morgan wrote three books about speech and theatre.

- An Hour with Delsarte (1889)
- Selected Readings, designed to impart to the student an appreciation of literature in its wider sense (1909)
- The Art of Speech and Deportment (1909)

== Sources ==
- Donawerth, Jane (2002). Rhetorical Theory by Women Before 1900. Lanham, Maryland: Rowman and Littlefield. pp. 255–256.
- James, Edward T; Janet Wilson James; Paul S. Boyer (1971). Notable American Women, 1607–1950, a Biographical Dictionary. Cambridge, MA: Belknap of Harvard UP.
- Marquis, Albert (1899). John W. Leonard (ed.). Who's Who in America. Chicago: A. N. Marquis & Company.
