= Robert Kennicott =

American naturalist and herpetologist

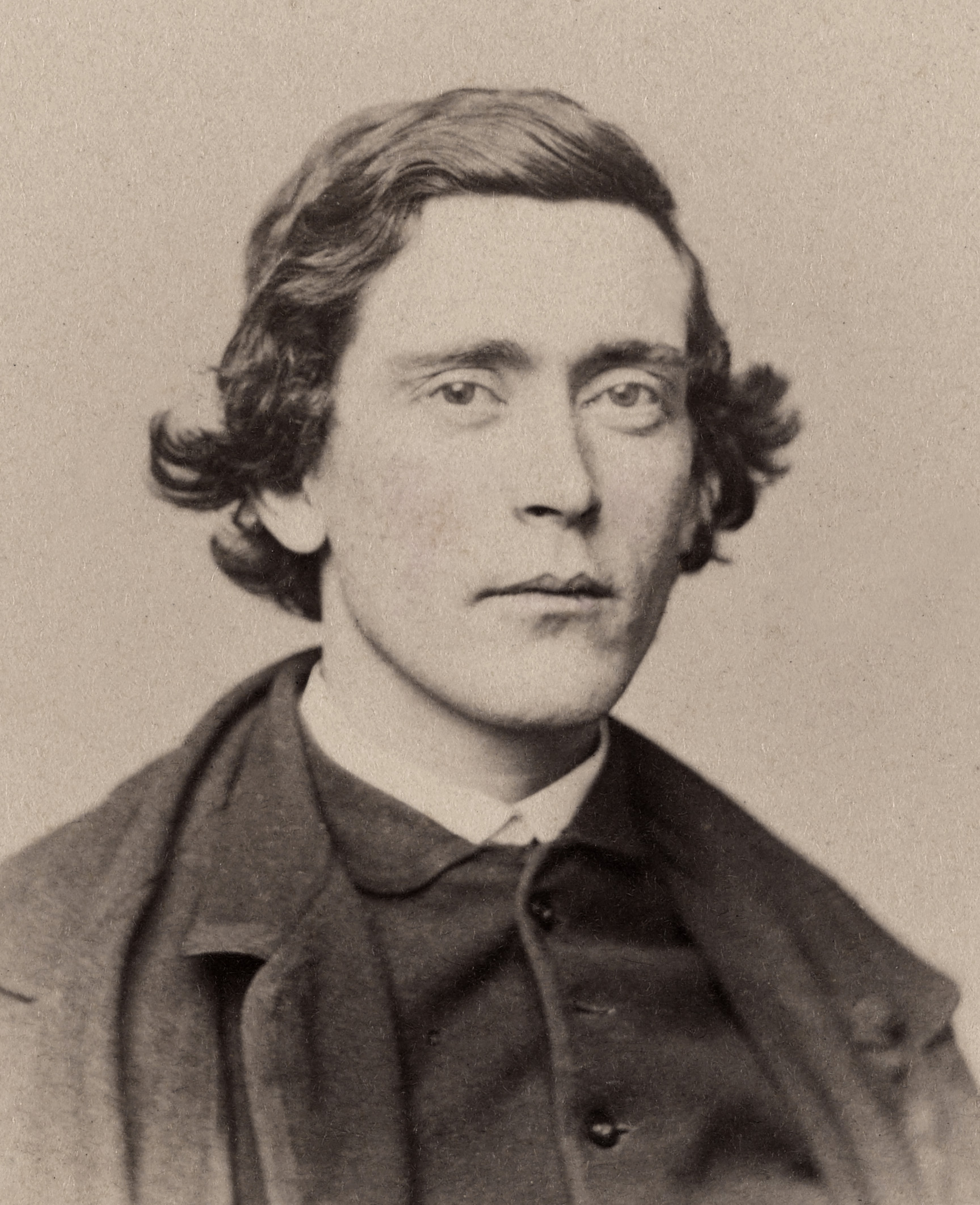
- Born: November 13, 1835; New Orleans, Louisiana, U.S.
- Died: May 13, 1866 (aged 30); Near Fort Nulato, Alaska
- Scientific career
- Fields: Zoology, herpetology

Robert Kennicott (November 13, 1835 – May 13, 1866) was an American naturalist and herpetologist. Chronic illness kept Kennicott out of school as a child. Instead, Kennicott spent most of his time outdoors, collecting plants and animals. His father schooled him at home and convinced naturalist Jared Potter Kirtland to take him as an understudy. Soon, Kennicott was providing specimens for the Smithsonian Institution via assistant secretary Spencer Fullerton Baird.

Kennicott advocated for the study and protection of native prairie animals in an era when farmers sought to eradicate them. He teamed with Northwestern University to found a natural history museum in 1857, then founded the Chicago Academy of Sciences. While in Chicago he served as a mentor to several young naturalists, including William Healey Dall. He joined the Megatherium Club and studied specimens in Hudson Bay. The Western Union Telegraph Expedition commissioned Kennicott as a scientist for their excursion in the mid-1860s. Kennicott died on the expedition and was memorialized as the namesake of Alaska's Kennicott Glacier. His home, "The Grove" in Glenview, Illinois, is today recognized as a National Historic Landmark by the National Park Service.

== Biography ==
Robert Kennicott was born in New Orleans, Louisiana, on November 13, 1835. His father, John Albert, was interested in botany and maintained a large land holding in Northfield Township, Cook County, Illinois, which came to be known as "The Grove". Robert was a sickly child and attempted to improve his overall health by spending much time outdoors. He did not attend school regularly, but his father ensured that he received an education at home. Under the tutelage of his father, Kennicott learned to patiently observe nature and began a collection of specimens.

Jared Potter Kirtland, a friend of Kennicott's father and one of the leading naturalists in the west, agreed to take Robert as an understudy in late 1852. Kennicott wintered with Kirtland in East Rockport (now Lakewood), Ohio. Kirtland encouraged Kennicott to contact other naturalists, and soon Kennicott had come to the attention of Spencer Fullerton Baird, the assistant secretary of the Smithsonian Institution. For the next thirteen years, Kennicott would correspond with Baird about his findings. As Illinois was still largely undocumented by naturalists, Baird encouraged Kennicott to send him specimens.

In 1855, the Illinois Central Railroad commissioned the Illinois State Agricultural Society to prepare a survey of the state's natural resources. Kennicott's father was the secretary of the society and recommended Robert for the job. After the excursion, Kennicott published a catalog of the animals of Cook County. The first new animal species identified by Kennicott was a Northern Illinois snake, which he sent to Baird. Baird suggested that Kennicott name the animal after Kirtland, Regina kirtlandii (today Clonophis kirtlandii). Kennicott published a three-part paper from 1856 to 1858 entitled "The Quadrupeds of Illinois, Injurious and Beneficial to the Farmer". In it, Kennicott pleaded with farmers to first study the habits of wild animals before attempting to eradicate them. The Board of Trustees of Northwestern University approached Kennicott in early 1857, asking him to help them create a natural history museum. Later that year, Kennicott co-founded the Chicago Academy of Sciences. For the next two winters, Kennicott worked at the Smithsonian in Washington, D.C., helping Baird organize its amphibian and reptile collections. There, he met William Stimpson and became a part of the Megatherium Club.

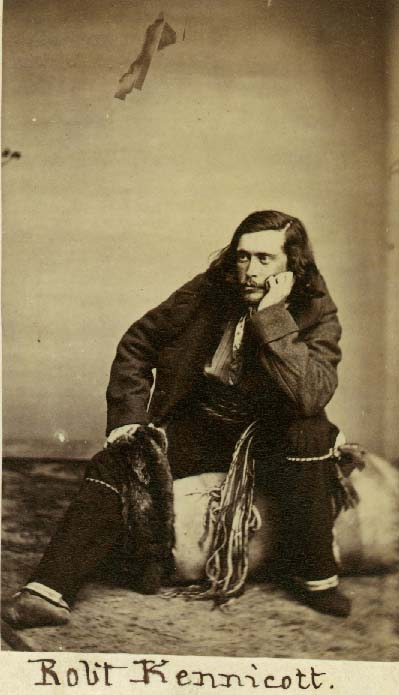
Robert Kennicott by Samuel Montague Fassett

In April 1859 he set off on an expedition to collect natural history specimens in the subarctic boreal forests of northwestern Canada in what is now the Mackenzie and Yukon river valleys and in the Arctic tundra beyond. Kennicott became popular with Hudson's Bay Company fur traders in the area and encouraged them to collect and send natural history specimens and First Nations artifacts to the Smithsonian. He returned to Washington at the end of 1862. Kennicott considered joining the Union Army in the Civil War, but was convinced otherwise, sending a substitute. Robert and his younger brother lived in the Smithsonian Castle during the war along with Edward Drinker Cope and other noted naturalists. He returned to Illinois in 1863 to tend to his ailing father, who died later that year.

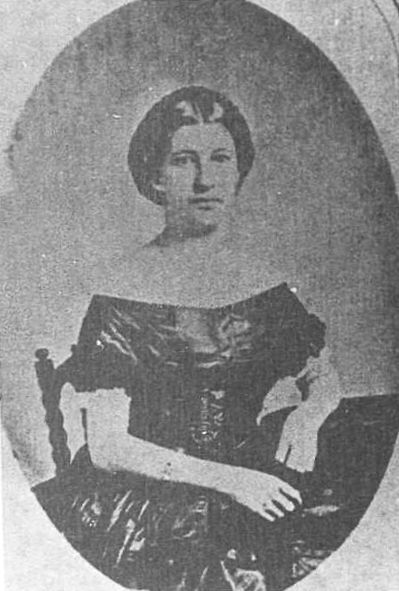
Helen Teunisson

While working at the Smithsonian Institution under Assistant Secretary Spencer F. Baird, Robert Kennicott wrote the original descriptions of many new snake taxa brought back by expeditions to the American West. He also collected snake specimens including with his specimen collecting first cousin Helen L. Teunisson. He subsequently named the subspecies Carphophis amoenus helenae in her honor.

In 1864 the Western Union Telegraph Expedition was mounted to find a possible route for a telegraph line between North America and Russia by way of the Bering Sea. Kennicott was selected as the scientist for this expedition, and the party of naturalists sent to assist him included W.H. Dall.

The expedition arrived in San Francisco in April 1865, but disagreements between its leaders meant that little was achieved. The party moved north to Vancouver where Kennicott suffered a period of ill health. After his recovery they moved north again to Alaska in August 1865. Kennicott died in May 1866 while traveling up the Yukon River. His body was returned to his family's home in Illinois, enclosed in a metal canister and shipped via Russia and Japan rather than sent back on undeveloped trails through Canada.

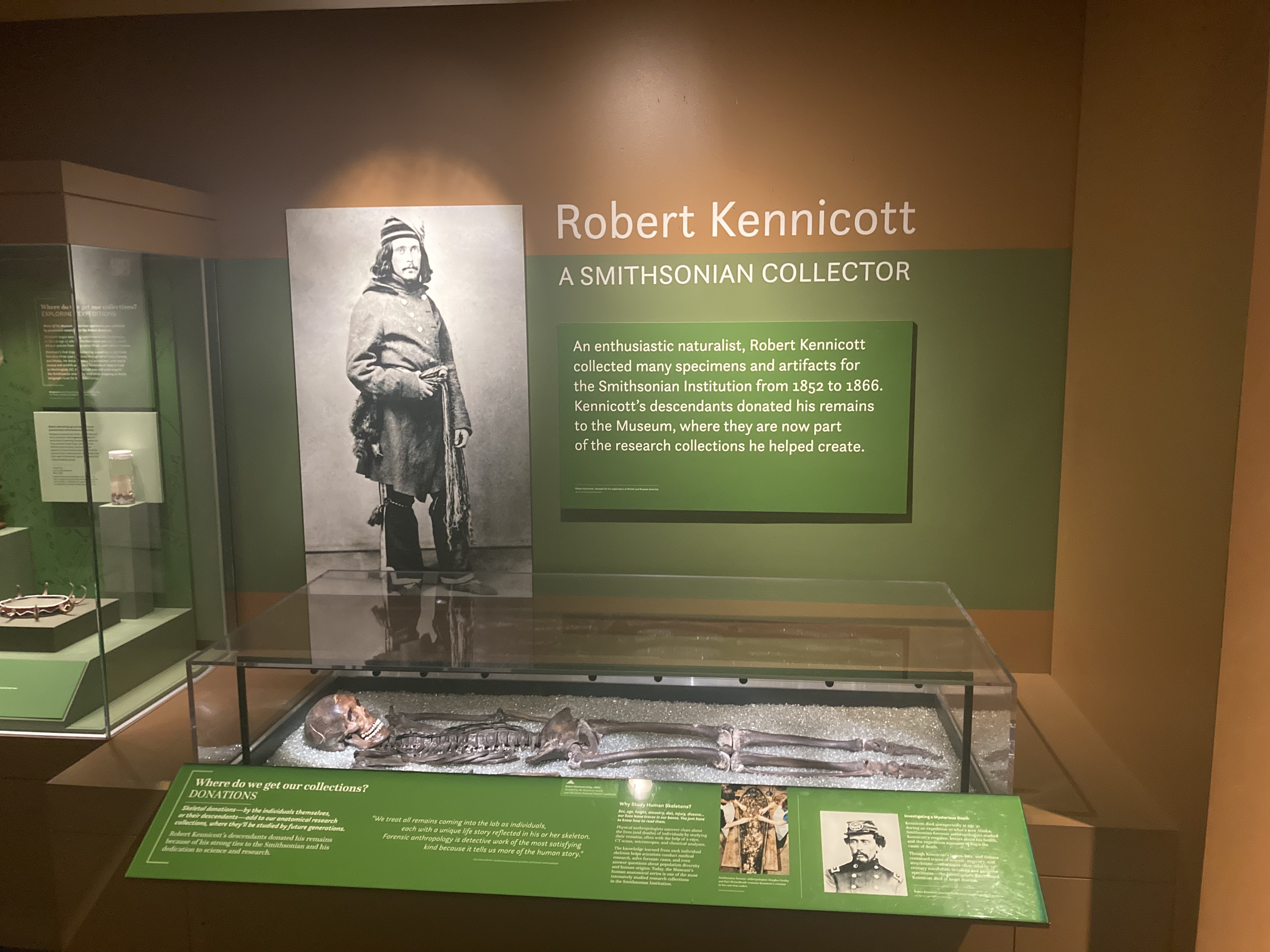
Kennicott's skeleton on display at the Smithsonian's National Museum of Natural History

In an interesting twist, the scientist became the subject of study. An investigation in 2001–2016 into the cause of his death suggested that Kennicott may have suffered from long QT syndrome, a congenital cardiac condition that can cause an irregular heartbeat, weakness, and fainting spells. This was made worse by strychnine, a drug that Kennicott regularly self-administered to improve his condition, but which only aggravated it. According to a summary of the research in the Washington Post, "the combination of stress, physical exhaustion and toxic 'medicine' was too much for the young scientist's weak heart," and led to his death by cardiac arrest. With permission of his family, his body has been added to the human anatomy collection at the Smithsonian.

== Legacy ==
To commemorate his efforts on behalf of science, Kennicott Glacier, Kennicott Valley, MV Kennicott, and the Kennicott River were named after him. The town of Kennecott, famous for rich copper mines, was named for its proximity to the glacier. However, the name was slightly misspelled. Natural features have retained the original spelling of his name, while the mines and related businesses have continued to use this alternate spelling.

Additionally, two birds retain Kennicott's name: the western screech owl (Megascops kennicottii ) and the Alaskan Arctic Warbler (Phylloscopus borealis kennicottii ).

Some of his papers are maintained at Northwestern University, others at his family home, The Grove, a National Historic Landmark in Glenview, Illinois, where his original grave remains in a family plot. His papers are also available on microfilm at the Glenview Public Library in the Genealogy & Local History Room.

A 3-D reconstruction of his face has been done by the Smithsonian Institution, by scanning his skull and using computers to reconstruct his facial structure. A 3-D copy of the skull was then made, onto which a sculptor molded clay into the facial reconstruction.

Nature writer Donald Culross Peattie (Donald C. Peattie) includes a sketch of Kennicott's life in Peattie's memoir, entitled "The Road of a Naturalist. Peattie spent time at Kennicott's Grove during his childhood.

== Bibliography ==
- Kennicott, R. (1855). "Catalogue of animals observed in Cook County, Illinois". Ill. State Ag. Soc. Trans. for 1853-1854 1: 577-595.
- Kennicott, R. (1856). "Description of a new snake from Illinois". Acad. Nat. Sci. Phil. Proc. 8: 95-96.
- Kennicott, R. (1859). "Notes on Coluber calligaster of Say, and a description of new species of serpents in the collection of the North Western University of Evanston, Illinois". Acad. Nat. Sci. Phila. Proc. 1859: 98-100.
- Kennicott, R. (1861). "On three new forms of rattlesnakes". Proceedings of the Academy of Natural Sciences of Philadelphia 13: 206-208.
- Audubon to Xanthus: The Lives of Those Commemorated in North American Bird Names. Mearns and Mearns ISBN 0-12-487423-1
- Schlachtmeyer, S. S. (2010). A death decoded: Robert Kennicott and the Alaska telegraph : a forensic investigation. Alexandria, Va: Voyage Publishing.
- Vasile, Ronald S. (1994). "The Early Career of Robert Kennicott, Illinois' Pioneering Naturalist." Journal of the Illinois State Historical Society vol. 87: 150-70.
