= Alliance Française de Chicago =

- Type: French cultural and language center
- Established: 1897
- Location: Chicago, Illinois, United States
- Website: https://www.af-chicago.org/
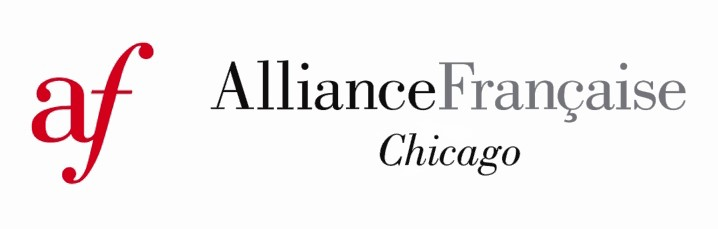

The Alliance Française de Chicago was established in 1897, and is one of the oldest Alliance Française branches in the US. Originally located in the Fine Arts Building on South Michigan Avenue and currently on Dearborn Avenue, it aims to be "Chicago's French cultural and learning center dedicated to the study of French language, cultural exchange, and friendship between Americans and French speaking people." Richard W. Shepro serves as the President of the Board, and Mary Ellen Connellan is the executive director.

The Alliance Française de Chicago offers many interactive events for children and adults including preschool programs, youth summer camps, French classes ranging from beginners to proficient speakers, and French movie nights.

French language classes at the Alliance offers students different levels of proficiency as well as different lengths of classes.

== History ==
Founded in 1897, with the mandate to promote French culture in Chicago, the Alliance Française is among the oldest of cultural institutions in the city. Prominent Chicagoans on the founding Board of Trustees were James Deering, Z.P. Briosseau, Charles Henrotin, William Burry, H. Chatfield-Taylor, Charles R. Crane (the first American minister to Russia and China), William R. Harper (first president of the University of Chicago), Herbert S. Stone and James Gamble Rogers.

Originally located in the Fine Arts Building on South Michigan Avenue, the initial activities of the Alliance included language lessons, lectures and a lending library of French books and materials. Le Cercle, a salon of causeries littéraires, provided a unique opportunity to hear and speak French. In the early 1900s, the Alliance joined with the Art Institute and the University of Chicago to expand into a much-needed teaching space.

As the Alliance's activities grew, the organization continued to move to larger spaces and in 1983 it finally found its current home at 810 North Dearborn Street, part of a row of historic townhouses that were slated for demolition. The Ecole Boulle in Paris chose the Chicago Alliance's new home for a renovation project in celebration of the Ecole's centenary. The particularly French architectural designs were complemented with furnishings from France, and included paving the parkway in front of 810 North Dearborn Street with imported Paris cobblestones. Today, the Boardroom on the fourth floor remains the most impressive example of the Boulle décor.

The adjoining building at 54 West Chicago Avenue was acquired in 1997 with a gift from the French government, followed by a capital campaign led by visionary members of the Board of Directors to renovate the newly acquired space. The main floor auditorium, Salon, upstairs classrooms and lobby, demonstration and teaching kitchen, as well as the renovated library space and Chez Kids Academy in the Dearborn building all bear witness to plans for expanding the Alliance's reach in Chicago as a center for French language and French-speaking culture.

Throughout its history, the Alliance Française de Chicago has played host to a diverse group of guests, welcoming presidents, ambassadors, royalty, authors, film directors, fashion designers, academics and visual and performing artists to its premises.

Notable literary figures lecturing at the Alliance have included Simone de Beauvoir, André Maurois, Jean Giraudoux, Michel Butor, Philippe Claudel, Nobel laureate J.M.G. LeClézio, and François Nourissier, who later became President of the Académie Goncourt, and the philosophers Henri Bergson, Jacques Maritain and former Justice Minister Robert Badinter. Professors from the Sorbonne and other distinguished French universities have given lectures in their areas of expertise at a number of Alliance events over the years.

The Alliance has hosted couturiers such as Pierre Balmain and Hubert de Givenchy. The performing arts have been represented with appearances by Sarah Bernhardt, Edith Piaf, Margot Fonteyn, Rudolf Nureyev, Maurice Chevalier, Marcel Marceau, George Balanchine, Yul Brynner, Maria Callas, Régine Crespin, Sean Connery, and Audrey Hepburn. To encourage an appreciation of French theater, the Alliance, in partnership with the Chicago Shakespeare Theatre has been instrumental in bringing performances of la Comédie Française to Chicago.

Since its establishment, the Alliance Française de Chicago has functioned as a concerned global citizen, making important contributions to the war relief effort of World War I, World War II and to the reconstruction efforts after those wars. The Alliance held fundraisers for the war-time needs of the American Red Cross. Members rolled surgical dressings and knit sweaters in Alliance facilities to be sent to Europe. Some of the most generous members of the Alliance were awarded the Légion d’Honneur for their efforts in supplying grain and supplies for devastated France after World War I. The Alliance also provided complimentary French language instruction for service men and women who were deployed to Europe at that time.

Today, the Alliance Française de Chicago continues its long tradition of bringing lecturers to Chicago, including authors, filmmakers and directors, winemakers, chefs, designers, historians, actors and performing artists. The organization reports having nearly 2,000 members and over 3,500 enrollments throughout the year.

== French school ==
The Alliance offers small-size classes for every level of French throughout the year. Free placement tests are available for students who wish to assess their level and the correct class fit. The Alliance implements French-American Educational Standards (AF Frames) to ensure that clear learning goals are set and attained. Classes are conducted exclusively in French, and emphasize all aspects of language-acquisition: grammar, vocabulary, comprehension, pronunciation and more. Teachers are native or bilingual and certified to teach French as a foreign language. The Alliance offers 4- and 8-week class sessions at seven different levels of study.

== Cultural programming ==
The Alliance offers a wide variety of cultural programs throughout the year. The signature offering of the Alliance's cinema program is the annual retrospective. Each year, a new facet of French cinema is explored, and new Chicago personalities are invited to share their thoughts and perspectives on the films.
