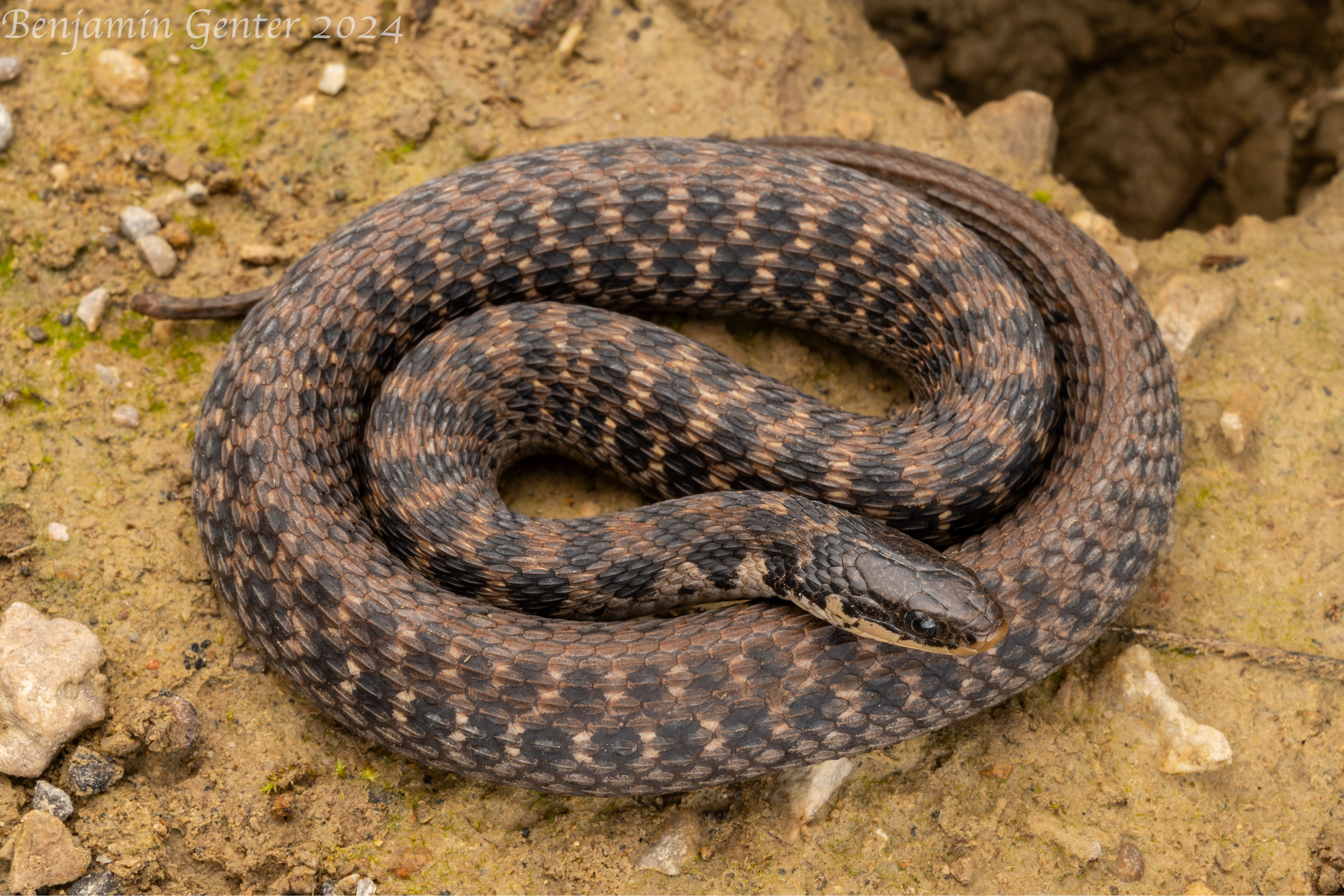
- in southern Indiana

Conservation status
- Near Threatened (IUCN 3.1)

Scientific classification
- Kingdom: Animalia
- Phylum: Chordata
- Class: Reptilia
- Order: Squamata
- Suborder: Serpentes
- Family: Colubridae
- Genus: Clonophis; Cope, 1889
- Species: C. kirtlandii

Binomial name
- Clonophis kirtlandii (Kennicott, 1856)
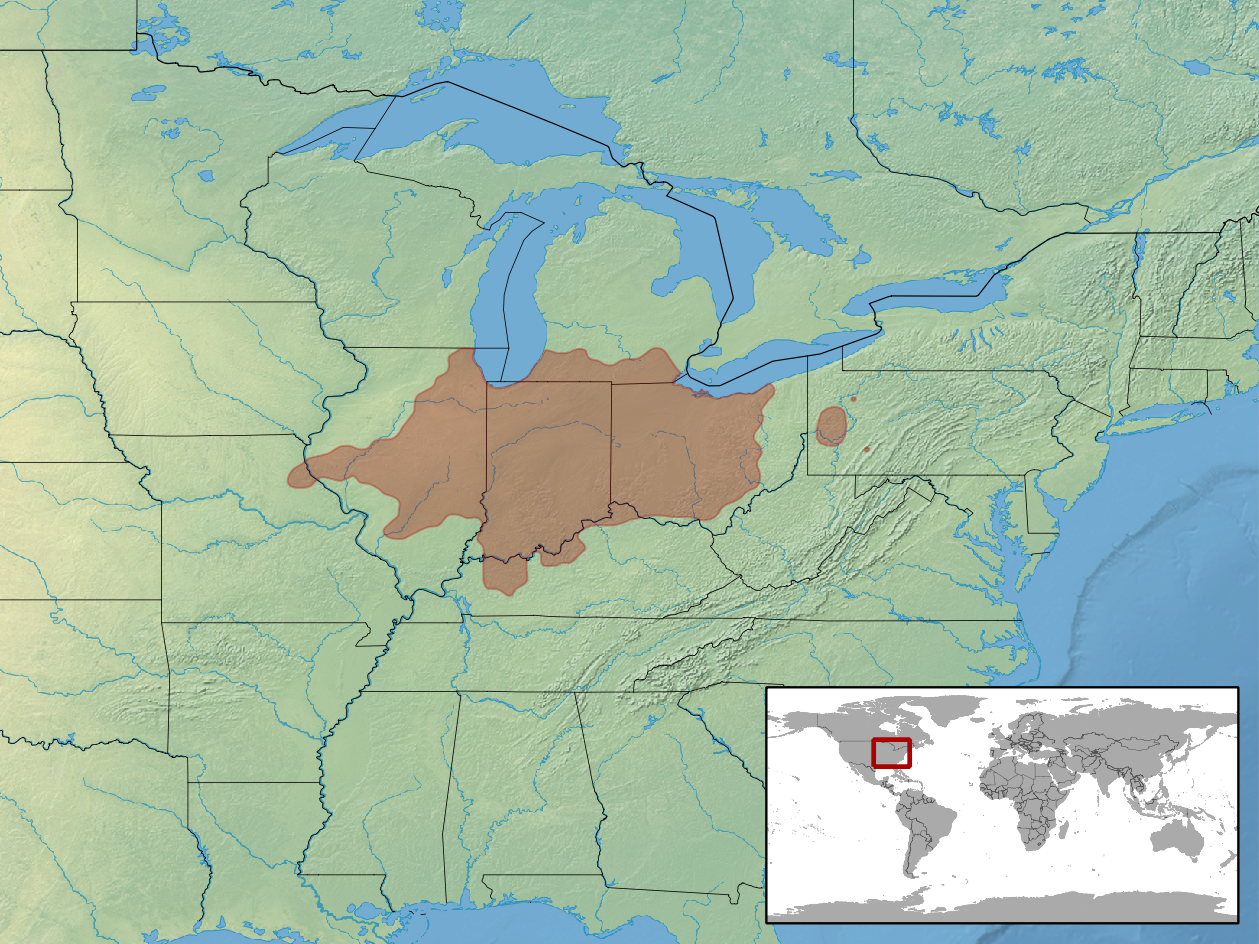

Synonyms
- Regina kirtlandii Kennicott, 1856; Tropidonotus kirtlandii — Garman, 1884; Ischnognathus kirtlandii — Jan, 1860; Natrix kirtlandii — Cope, 1900; Clonophis kirtlandi — H. M. Smith & Brodie, 1982

= Kirtland's snake =

Species of snake

Kirtland's snake (Clonophis kirtlandii) is a threatened or endangered (depending on location) North American species of nonvenomous snake of the subfamily Natricinae, of the family Colubridae. It is the only species in the genus Clonophis.

== Etymology ==
The specific name, kirtlandii, is in honor of Dr. Jared Potter Kirtland, an American naturalist of the nineteenth century. The snake was first identified by Robert Kennicott in 1855. Kennicott sent a specimen to Spencer Fullerton Baird, the assistant secretary of the Smithsonian Institution, who offered to publish a description of the animal in Kennicott's name. Baird suggested Regina kirtlandii as a scientific name, as Kirtland had been a mentor to Kennicott.

== Common names ==
Common names for C. kirtlandii include: Cora Kennicott's snake, Kirtland's red snake, Kirtland's water snake, little red snake, Ohio Valley water snake, and spread head.

== Description ==
Kirtland's snake is small and slender. Adults reach a total length (including tail) of 12-18 inches (30–46 cm). It is grayish brown with a double series of large black spots down the back, and alternating smaller spots running down each side. The ventral scales are brick red with a prominent round black spot at each outer end. It has 19 rows of keeled dorsal scales at midbody, and the anal plate is divided.

== Geographic range ==
Clonophis kirtlandii is currently known to occur in Illinois, Indiana, Kentucky, southern Michigan, northeastern Missouri, Ohio, and northwestern Tennessee. Clonophis kirtlandii was historically known from Western Pennsylvania, but it has not been documented in the state since 1966.

== Habitat ==
The preferred natural habitats of C. kirtlandii are forest, grassland, and wetlands such as swamps and marshes. It is almost always found very close to a water source, even though it is less aquatic than water snakes of the genus Nerodia which share its geographic range. Field studies have shown that populations are found within areas with abundant grass, herbaceous vegetation, and shrubs during the spring season.

== Conservation status ==
The species Clonophis kirtlandii is listed as endangered in Indiana, Michigan, and Pennsylvania. It is listed as threatened in Illinois and Ohio. In Missouri, it is listed as a "Species of Conservation Concern".

== Diet ==
Kirtland's snake preys primarily on earthworms, slugs, minnows, salamanders, frogs, and toads. It has also been found to prey on juvenile crayfish and leeches.

== Behavior ==
When alarmed C. kirtlandii flattens its entire body to a remarkable thinness, and becomes rigid. Most information about the behavior of this species is anecdotal, given its small populations and patchy occurrence. When inactive, Kirtland's snake coils into a small disc.

No person on record has ever been bitten by a Kirtland's snake. This species prefers intimidation, hiding, and fleeing rather than any form of fighting.

== Reproduction ==
Kirtland's snake is ovoviviparous. Females give birth in August and September. Brood size varies from 4 to 22. Each newborn is 13–17 cm (5–6¾ in.) in total length and averages 1.4 gm in weight.
