= Clara Barck Welles =

American silversmith and suffragist

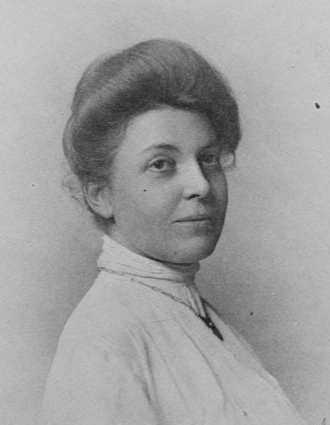
Clara Barck Welles (1906)

Clara Pauline Barck Welles (1869–1965) was an American silversmith who from 1910 was also successful as a suffragist. In 1900, after graduating in decorative design from the School of the Art Institute of Chicago, she encouraged five of her fellow graduates to join her in creating the Kalo Shop where they produced jewelry, textiles and leather goods. By the late 1930s, she was specializing in silverware, employing 25 silversmiths who were mostly Scandinavian immigrants. Her creations were included in an exhibit at the Museum of Modern Art.

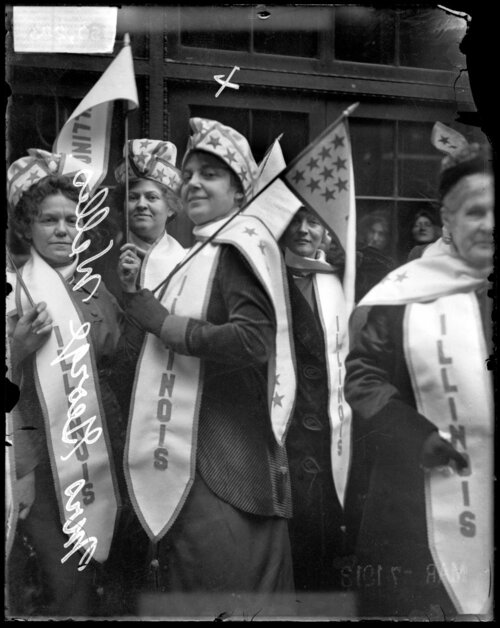
Clara Welles preparing for the Suffrage March in 1913

== Biography ==
Born in Ellenville, New York, on August 4, 1868, Clara Pauline Barck was the daughter of the shoemaker Johannes (John H.) Barck, a Finnish immigrant, and his wife Margaret née Bauman who had emigrated from Switzerland. She was the fourth of the family's six daughters. When she was 10, the family moved to a farm in Oregon City. After her father died when she was 15, the women ran the farm. After first working as a weaver in the woolen mill at the Oregon City Manufacturing Co., she took a course at the Portland Business College. From 1890, she worked in bookkeeping and sales at department stores in Portland and San Francisco.

After the farm had been sold in 1898, Clara moved to Chicago where she studied decorative design at the School of the Art Institute of Chicago. Shortly after graduating, in September 1900 she and five of her fellow graduates opened the Kalo Shop where they created and sold their crafts, including book plates, jewelry, textiles, metalwork and leather goods. In 1905, she married the metalworker George S. Welles. The following year, the couple transferred their business to the city suburb of Park Ridge where they opened the Kalo Shop Arts Crafts Workshop in a large farmhouse. They hired Art Institute graduates and Scandinavian metalsmiths to produce silverware and jewelry. In addition, they opened a craft school and organized exhibitions. The enterprise became one of the largest businesses in the area, reaching over 50 employees.

In 1910, Clara Barck became involved in the cause for women's suffrage, joining the Chicago Political Equity League. In 1912, she was elected chair of the Park Ridge Improvement Association (now the Twentieth Century Club) and the following year she headed the Parade Committee for the Illinois Delegation in the Votes for Women Procession in Washington, D.C., enthusiastically leading a large contingent of marchers. In 1914, she addressed a rally at Chicago's Auditorium Theatre. Also in 1914, she hosted a fund-raising event in her Kalo Shop together with a group of society women. It was attended by some 100 women who contributed to the melting pots with a piece of gold or silver.

In 1916, her marriage with Welles ended in a divorce, after which she reorganized the Kalo shops and manufacturing operations. In the 1920s, business flourished but under the Great Depression her staff were reduced to just four. In 1936, she relocated the Kalo Shop on Chicago's Michigan Avenue where it remained for the next 34 years.

In the 1940s, Clara Barck Welles moved to San Diego. She died on March 14, 1965, aged 96.
