= Martha Susan Baker =

American painter, muralist and teacher

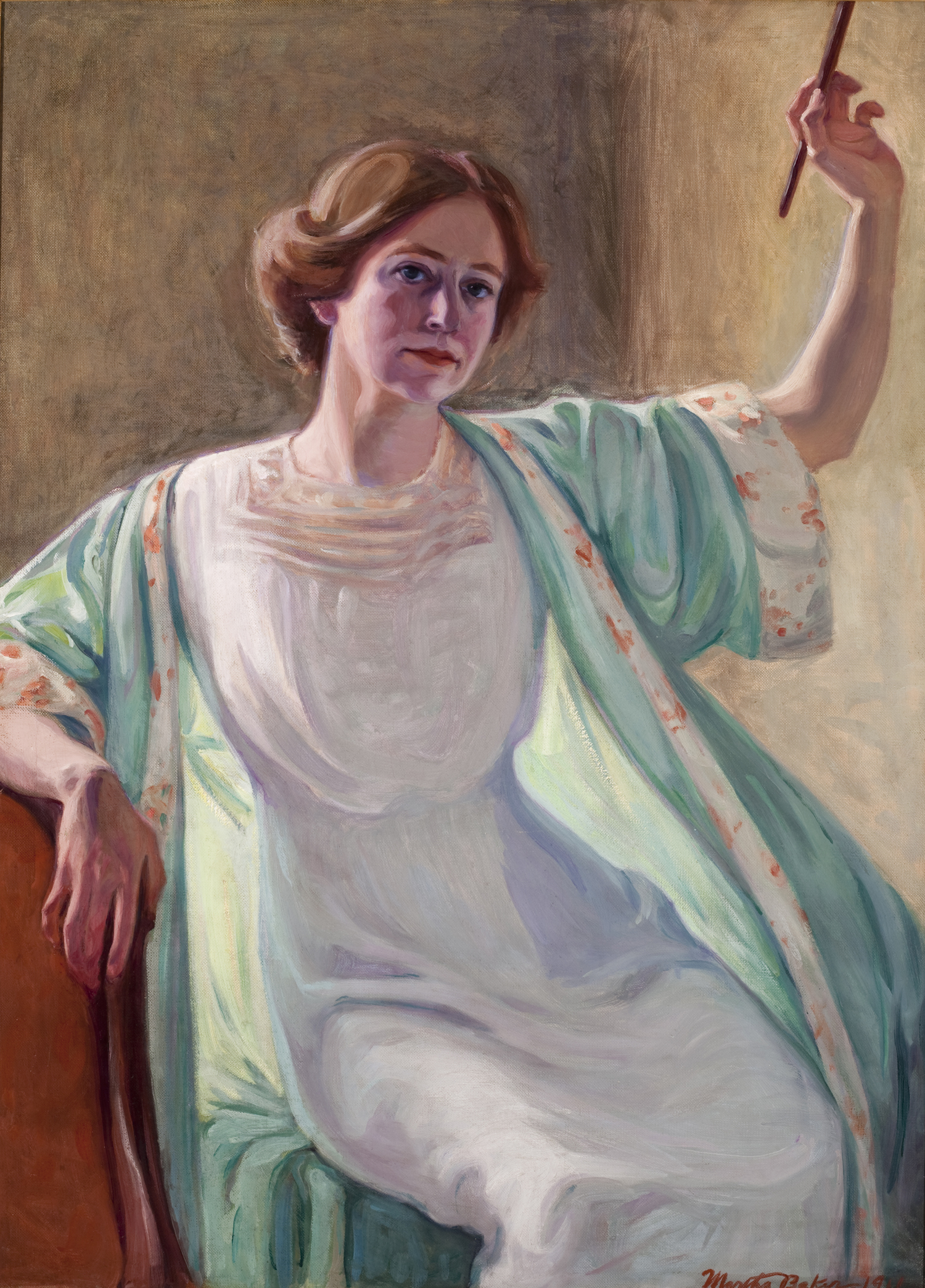
- Self-portrait ca. 1911
- Born: December 25, 1871; Evansville, Indiana, United States
- Died: December 21, 1911 (aged 39); Chicago, Illinois, United States
- Known for: Painting

Martha Susan Baker (December 25, 1871 – December 21, 1911) was an American painter, muralist and teacher born in Evansville, Indiana, United States.

== Early life ==
Baker studied art at the School of the Art Institute of Chicago where she later taught.

== Career ==
She wrote and illustrated numerous articles for The Sketch Book: A magazine Devoted to the Fine Arts, published in Chicago.

Baker exhibited her work at the Illinois building at the 1893 World's Columbian Exposition in Chicago, Illinois.

Baker painted one in a series of eight murals, begun in 1900, that were located on the tenth floor of the Fine Arts Building, located at 410 South Michigan Avenue, Chicago.

In 1903, she appeared on the “Jury of Selection” for the Annual exhibition of the Art Students League of Chicago.

Baker died in Chicago in 1911.

== Works ==
referenced at unless otherwise noted.

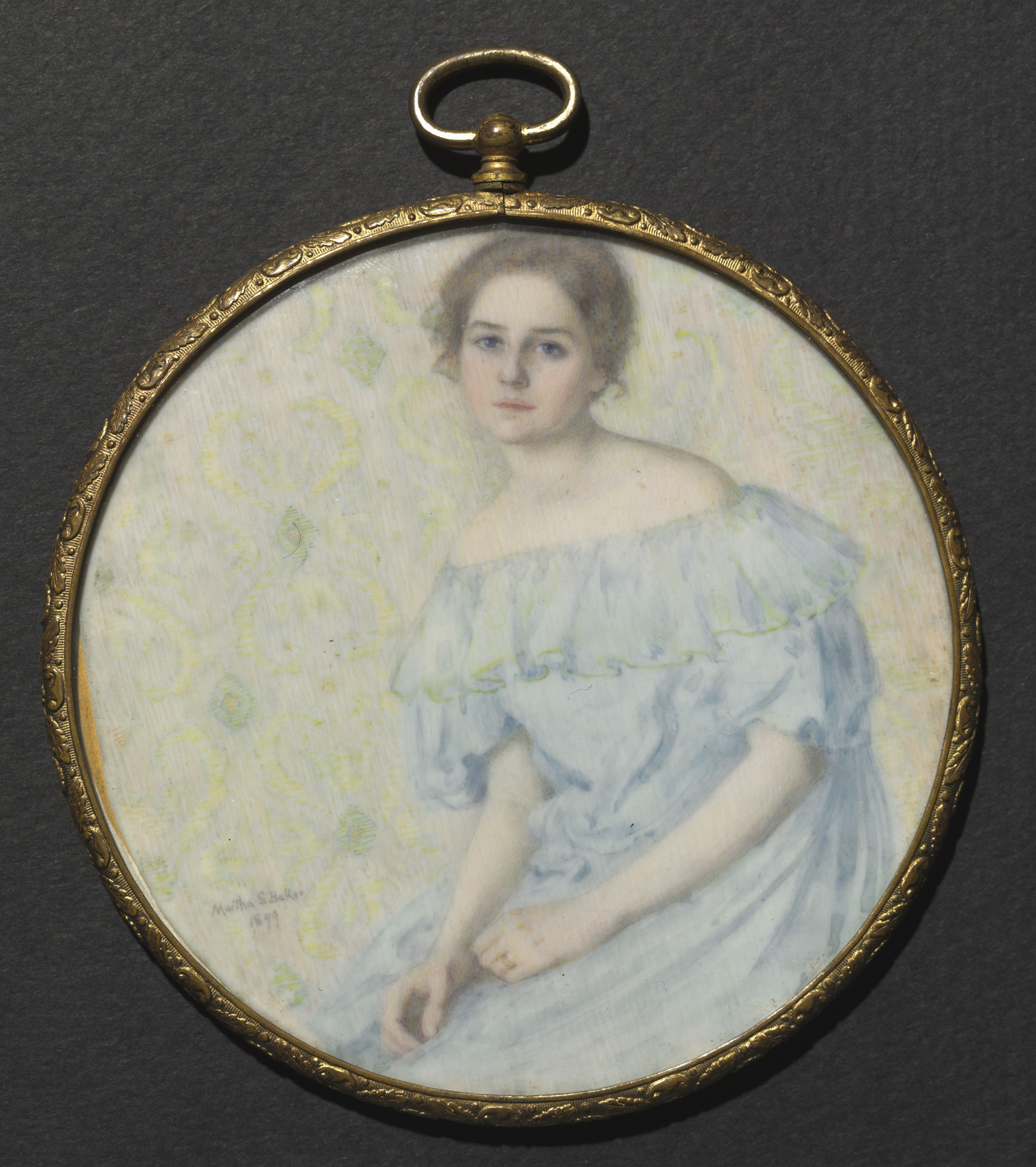
- The Blue Gown (Portrait of Ethel Coe), 1915.142, Cleveland Museum of Art
  Carl Van Vechten, portrait, Yale University, Beinecke Rare Book and Manuscript Library, New Haven, Connecticut
- Dr. Martin Henry Fischer, portrait, Cincinnati Art Museum, Cincinnati, Ohio
- Mrs. Martin Henry Fischer, Cincinnati Art Museum
- Girl's head, Cleveland Museum of Art, Cleveland, Ohio
- Miss Ethel Coe, portrait, Cleveland Museum of Art
- Twilight No. 2 1898, Smithsonian American Art Museum, Washington, D.C.
- Mrs. Otto Buehrmann, portrait, Chicago Historical Society, Chicago, Illinois
- Elizabeth Humphrey, portrait, Metropolitan Museum of Art, New York, New York
- In an Old Gown, Union League Club of Chicago, Chicago, Illinois
- Carl Van Vechten, portrait, American Academy and Institute of Arts and Letters, New York, New York
