= Jared Potter Kirtland =

American politician (1793–1877)

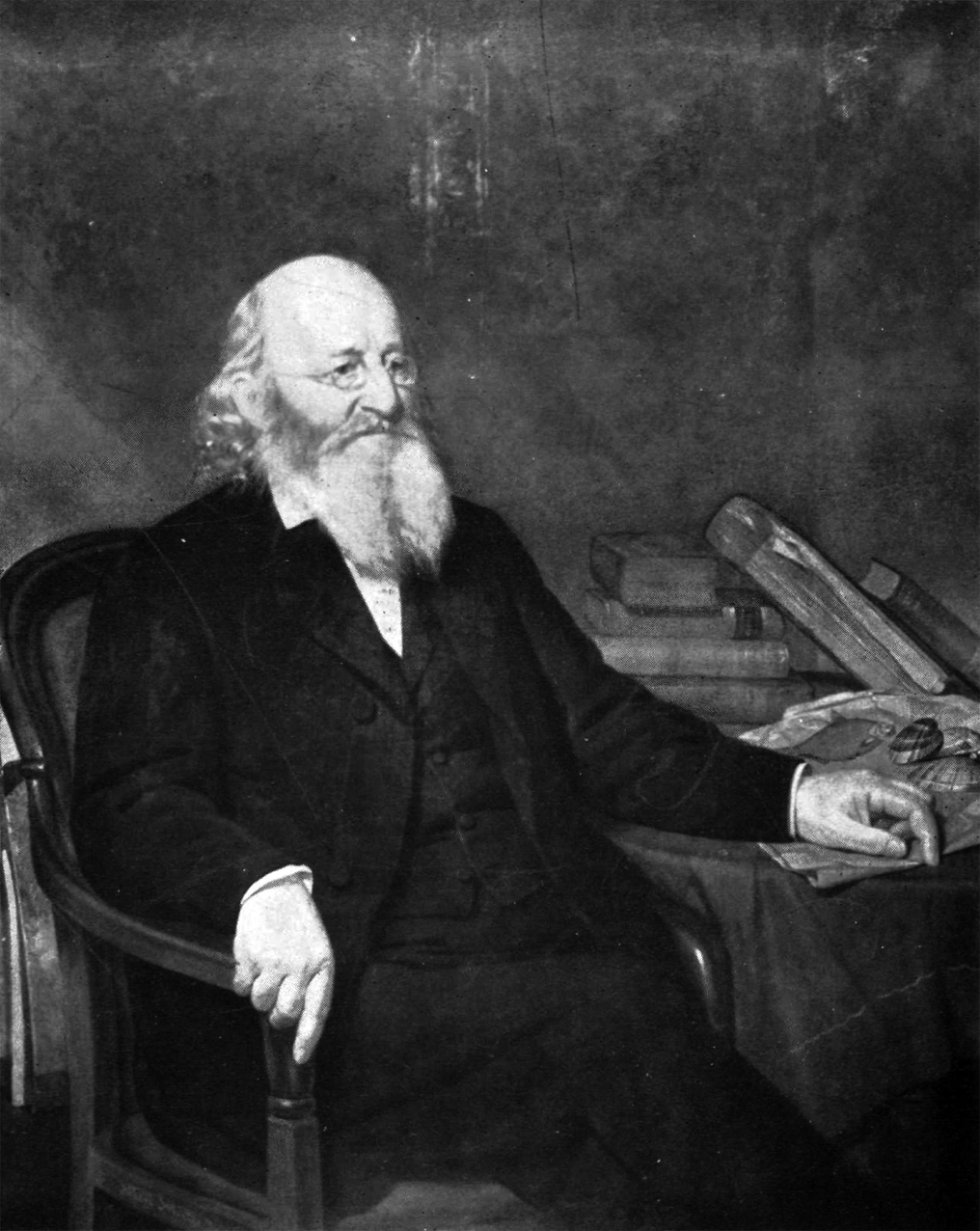
- Jared Potter Kirtland
- Born: November 10, 1793; Wallingford, Connecticut
- Died: December 10, 1877 (aged 84); Rockport, Ohio
- Scientific career
- Fields: natural history malacology
- Workplaces: Cleveland Museum of Natural History

Signature
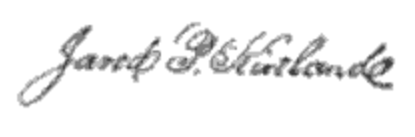

Jared Potter Kirtland (November 10, 1793 – December 10, 1877) was an American naturalist, malacologist, and politician most active in the U.S. state of Ohio, where he served as a probate judge, and in the Ohio House of Representatives. He was also a physician and co-founder of Western Reserve University's Medical School, as well as what would become the Cleveland Museum of Natural History. The Kirtland Bird Club of Northeast Ohio, founded on September 28, 1940, is named after him.

== Early life ==
Kirtland was born in Wallingford, Connecticut. His mother was Mary, daughter of Dr. Jared Potter, a famous physician of Wallingford. His father, Turhand Kirtland, was largely interested in the purchases made by the Connecticut Land Company in Ohio, and moved to the Western Reserve in 1803. In the meantime the son remained in Wallingford. When Potter died in 1810, he left a legacy to provide for Jared's medical education at Edinburgh. But the War of 1812 with Great Britain prevented the voyage, and when the Yale School of Medicine went into operation in 1813, Kirtland was the first matriculated student in a class of 38 members. He was married in May, 1814, to Caroline, second daughter of Joshua Atwater, of Wallingford, and after graduation in 1815 he practiced in Wallingford until 1818, when he made a journey to Ohio to perfect arrangements for a removal thither. But on returning for his family he found a peculiarly attractive opportunity for establishing himself in Durham, Conn., and there remained until the death of his wife in 1823, when he carried out his intention of settling in Poland, Ohio.

He had acquired a large country practice, and had also been for three terms a member of the legislature, when in 1837 he was elected to the professorship of the theory and practice of medicine in the Ohio Medical College at Cincinnati. He resigned this position in 1842, having in the meantime purchased a fine fruit farm in East Rockport, five miles from the city of Cleveland, where he spent the rest of his life. In 1843 the medical department of the Western Reserve College was established, at Cleveland, and he filled the chair of theory and practice in that institution until 1864. He was elected an Associate Fellow of the American Academy of Arts and Sciences in 1855. Twenty years later, in 1875, he was elected as a member to the American Philosophical Society.

Besides his professional attainments, Dr. Kirtland was interested in all departments of natural history. He was an efficient assistant in the first geological survey of Ohio, and was untiring in his efforts to improve the horticulture and agriculture of his adopted state. He died at his residence in East Rockport, December 10, 1877, aged 84 years.

Shortly after the death of his first wife he was married to Hannah F. Toucey, of Newtown, Conn. Of three children by his first marriage, one daughter survived him. His great-grandson Kirtland Cutter became an architect, designing Yale Sheffield Scientific School and various personal residences such as the Patsy Clark Mansion.

== Taxon described by him ==
- See Category:Taxa named by Jared Potter Kirtland

== Taxon named in his honor ==
Kirtland's warbler (Setophaga kirtlandii), Kirtland's snake (Clonophis kirtlandii), and the forest vine snake (Thelotornis kirtlandii) are named after him.

== Sources ==
- "Jared Potter Kirtland" at the Dittrick Medical History Center
- "Jared Potter Kirtland" at the Illinois Natural History Survey, hosted by the University of Illinois at Urbana-Champaign
- "Jared Potter Kirtland" at the Encyclopedia of Cleveland History
- Gifford, G E (November 1972). "Dr. Jared Kirtland and his warbler". N. Engl. J. Med. 287 (18). UNITED STATES: 909–11. doi:10.1056/NEJM197211022871805. ISSN 0028-4793. PMID 4561669.
- FERTIG, H H (June 1955). "Some letters of Jared Potter Kirtland". Ohio Medicine. 51 (6). Not Available: 553–7. ISSN 0892-2454. PMID 14384204.

This article incorporates public domain material from the Yale Obituary Record.
