= Kalo Shops =

Arts and crafts

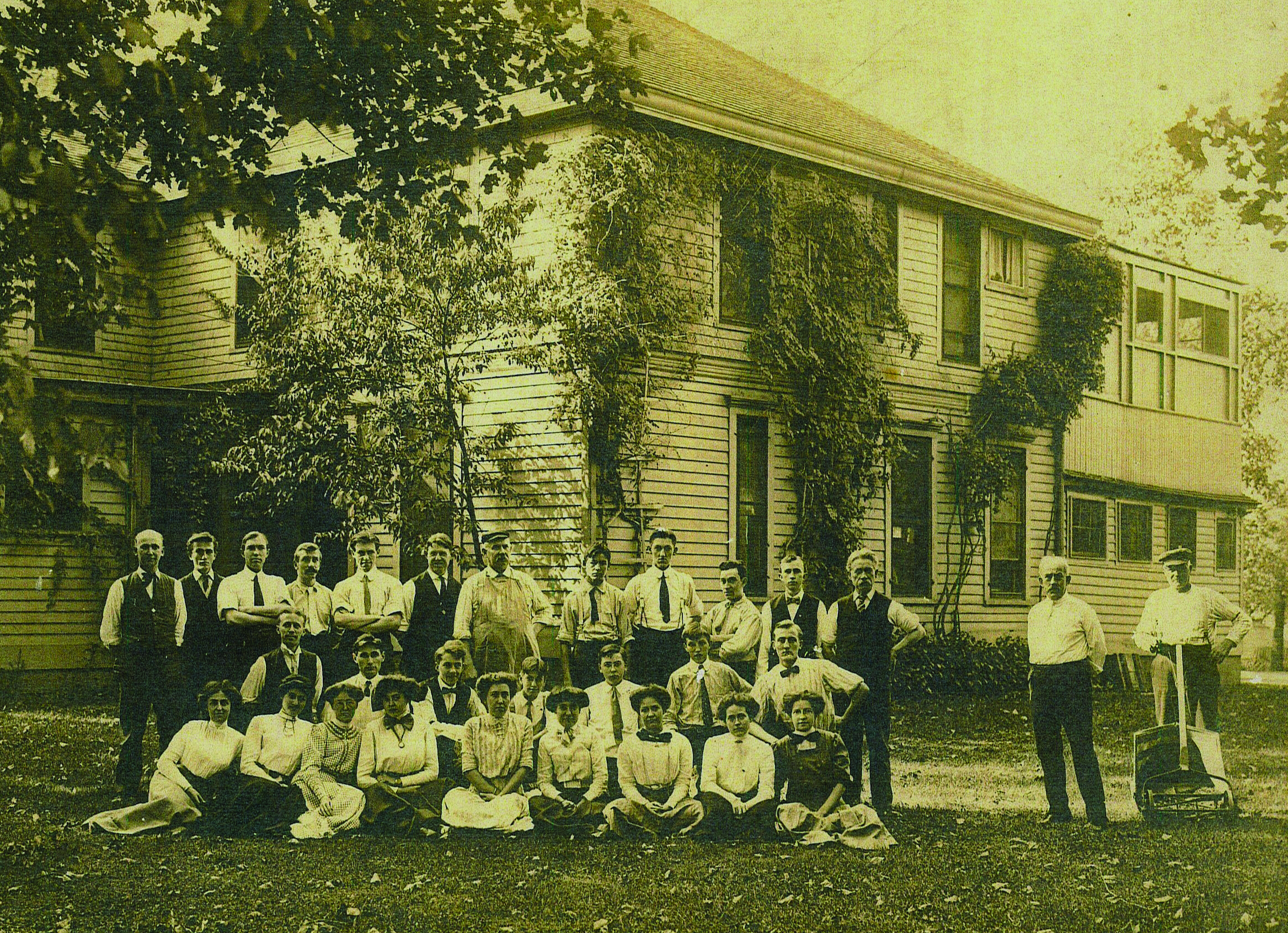
Metalsmiths, jewelers, designers and crafts workers seated in front of the Kalo Arts Crafts, c. 1910

The Kalo Shop was the "leading maker" of Arts and Crafts movement silver in Chicago. The shop and affiliated Kalo Arts and Crafts Community House, a practicing school and workshop noted for silver and jewelry in nearby Park Ridge, Illinois, were founded in 1900 by a group of six young women who had trained at the Art Institute of Chicago. Clara Pauline Barck Welles (1868-1965) was the group's leader and most notable member. The other founders were: Bertha Hall, Rose Dolese, Grace Gerow, Ruth Raymond, and Bessie McNeal.

The group, at first, worked in a variety of materials and media including burnt wood and leather but by the time the Chicago shop was opened in 1914, it was focused on silver, copper, and jewelry, though it rapidly transitioned to hand wrought silver flatware and hollowware, and gold and silver jewelry. In 1959, Barck Wells transferred the shop to four of the craftsmen; Robert Bower, Daniel Pederson, Arne Myhre, and Yngve Olsson. Barck hired women designers almost exclusively, although the immigrant Scandinavian craftsmen were male. At its peak, Kalo employed 25 silversmiths. After Barck's retirement, the firm continued to produce the pieces designed under her leadership until 1970, when it closed, due to the difficulty of finding young people willing to apprentice as silversmiths. In the summer 1992 issue of American Silversmith, Bower, the last, surviving Kalo silversmith, explained to an interviewer that, "We ran out of silversmiths. In the last year we lost our three top silversmiths; men who could not be replaced. It was difficult trying to find men willing to learn silversmithing and it took years to train them."

Today, Kalo pieces bring high prices at auction and belong to the collections of major museums.
