= Kennicott Grove =

Historic house in Illinois, United States

- U.S. National Register of Historic Places
- U.S. National Historic Landmark
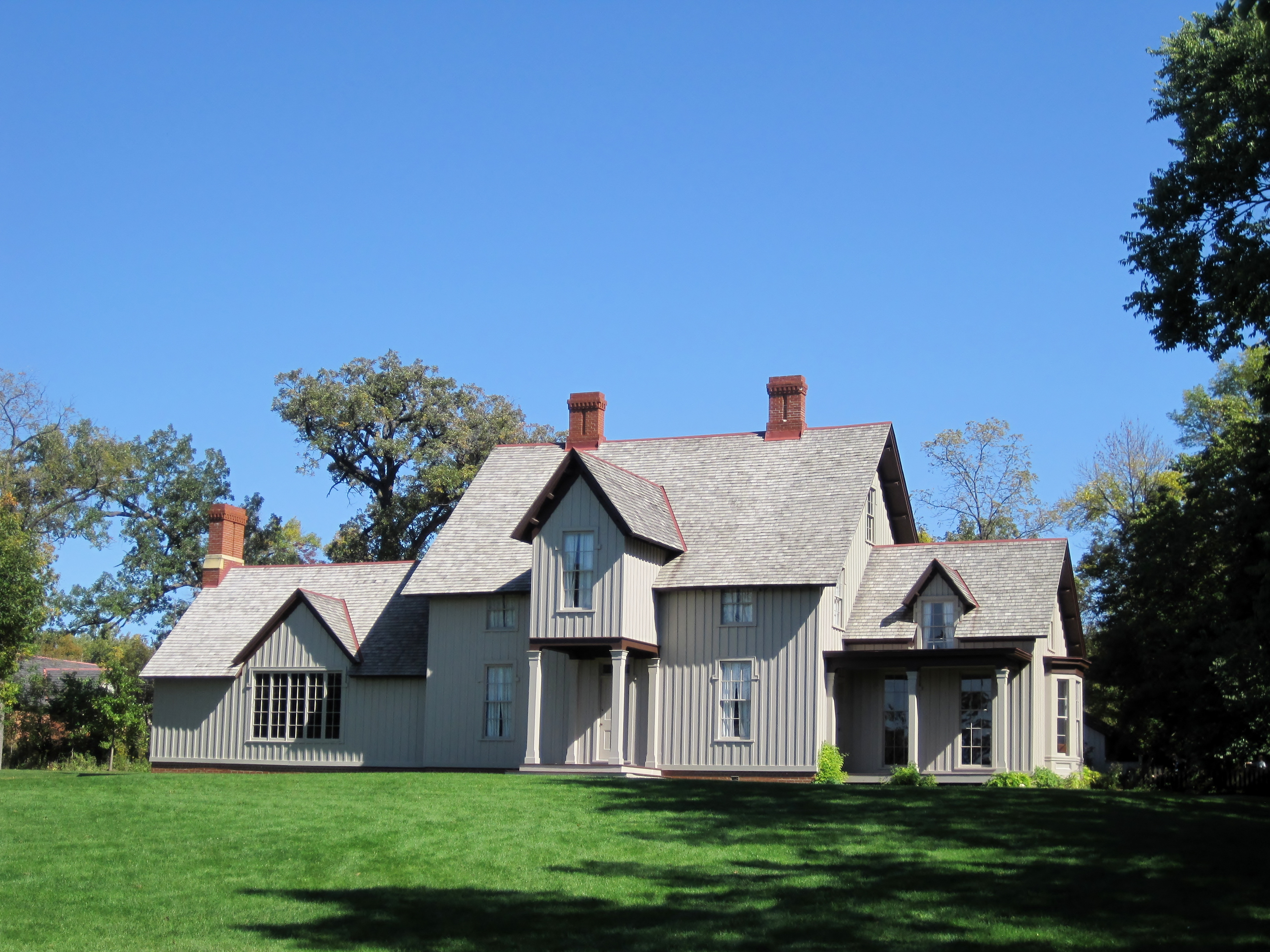
- John Kennicott House in 2010

- Location within Illinois Location within the United States
- Location: Glenview, Illinois
- Coordinates: 42°5′13″N 87°52′12″W
- Area: 50 acres (200,000 m^{2})
- Built: 1856
- NRHP reference No.: 73000698

Significant dates
- Added to NRHP: August 13, 1973
- Designated NHL: January 7, 1976

Kennicott Grove is an area of prairie and wooded lands in Glenview, Illinois, United States. It includes the home of John Kennicott (1802–1863) and his family, including his son Robert Kennicott (1835–1866). John Kennicott was an agriculturalist and a doctor. Robert Kennicott was a naturalist and an explorer, who founded the Chicago Academy of Sciences. The grove is 123 acres (0.50 km^{2}) in size and located near the intersection of Milwaukee and Lake avenues. Kennicott Grove was declared a National Historic Landmark in 1976. The site is maintained by the Glenview Park District as The Grove National Historic Landmark or also The Grove, and contains a nature interpretive center, historic buildings (some original and some recreated), and nature trails.

== History ==
John A. Kennicott was born near Saratoga, New York, in 1802. Kennicott taught in Buffalo, New York, then attended the Fairfield Medical College. Upon graduation, he taught for a year in Mississippi, then opened a medical office in New Orleans, Louisiana, in 1829. Seven years later, Kennicott moved with his wife and two sons to Northfield Township, Cook County, Illinois, an area that was almost completely undeveloped. He made a claim of several hundred acres 15 miles (24 km) south of Half Day between Lake Michigan and the Des Plaines River. Naming his homestead "The Grove" for the abundance of trees, Kennicott built a house on it around 1856.

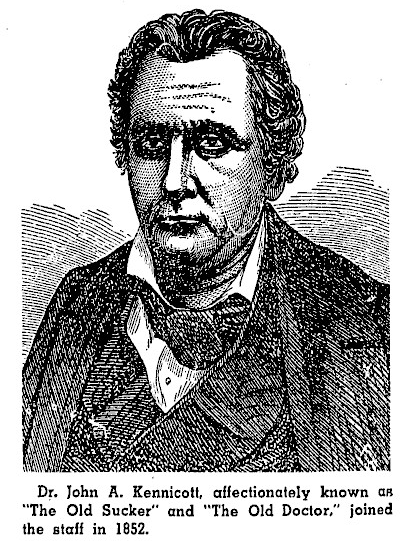
John A. Kennicott in the Prairie Farmer newspaper

Kennicott was the only physician in a wide circuit, at least 10 miles (16 km) in radius from The Grove. In the early 1840s, with his son Charles, Kennicott planted the first commercial nursery in the area. Botany increasingly became an interest for Kennicott, and he planted every kind of shrub that he could find during his travels. After co-founding the Illinois State Agricultural Society, Kennicott began to provide nurserymen with free scions from varieties grown at The Grove. Kennicott died at his home on June 4, 1863.

Robert Kennicott, John's second son, would become a renowned naturalist. Too sickly to attend public school, Kennicott was educated at The Grove and spent much of his youth outside on the property. Kennicott collected plants and animals there and taught his siblings to do the same. He identified dozens of new species at the Smithsonian Institution and co-founded the Chicago Academy of Sciences in 1857. While on the Western Union Telegraph Expedition in Russian America in 1866, Kennicott died of heart failure.

Kennicott descendant Bertha Redfield had the Redfield Estate built in 1929. The Tudor Revival house was designed by George Grant Elmslie. Three years later it became home to her daughter, author Louise Redfield Peattie, who was married to author Donald Culross. Her American Acres described its history, and Donald's A Prairie Grove (1938) describes his experiences at The Grove.

== Grounds ==
Kennicott Grove was originally about 250 acres (100 ha) of heavily wooded land with several ponds. The house, first built in 1856, has seen a number of additions and renovations. A south room and a kitchen wing branch off from a large rectangular building. The south room was added some time before 1878. A porch surrounding it was added around 1920. The exterior of the house features few details. The only decoration is in the treatment of eaves and some patterns around the second floor windows; it is otherwise plain board and batten. This type of siding is unusual in Illinois and distinguishes it from nearby architecture. The design was probably influenced by the popularity in the 1850s of works by Andrew Jackson Downing and Alexander Jackson Davis. Downing was an acquaintance of John Kennicott and may have been involved in the design, although the boxiness of the main section is unusual for a typical Downing house.

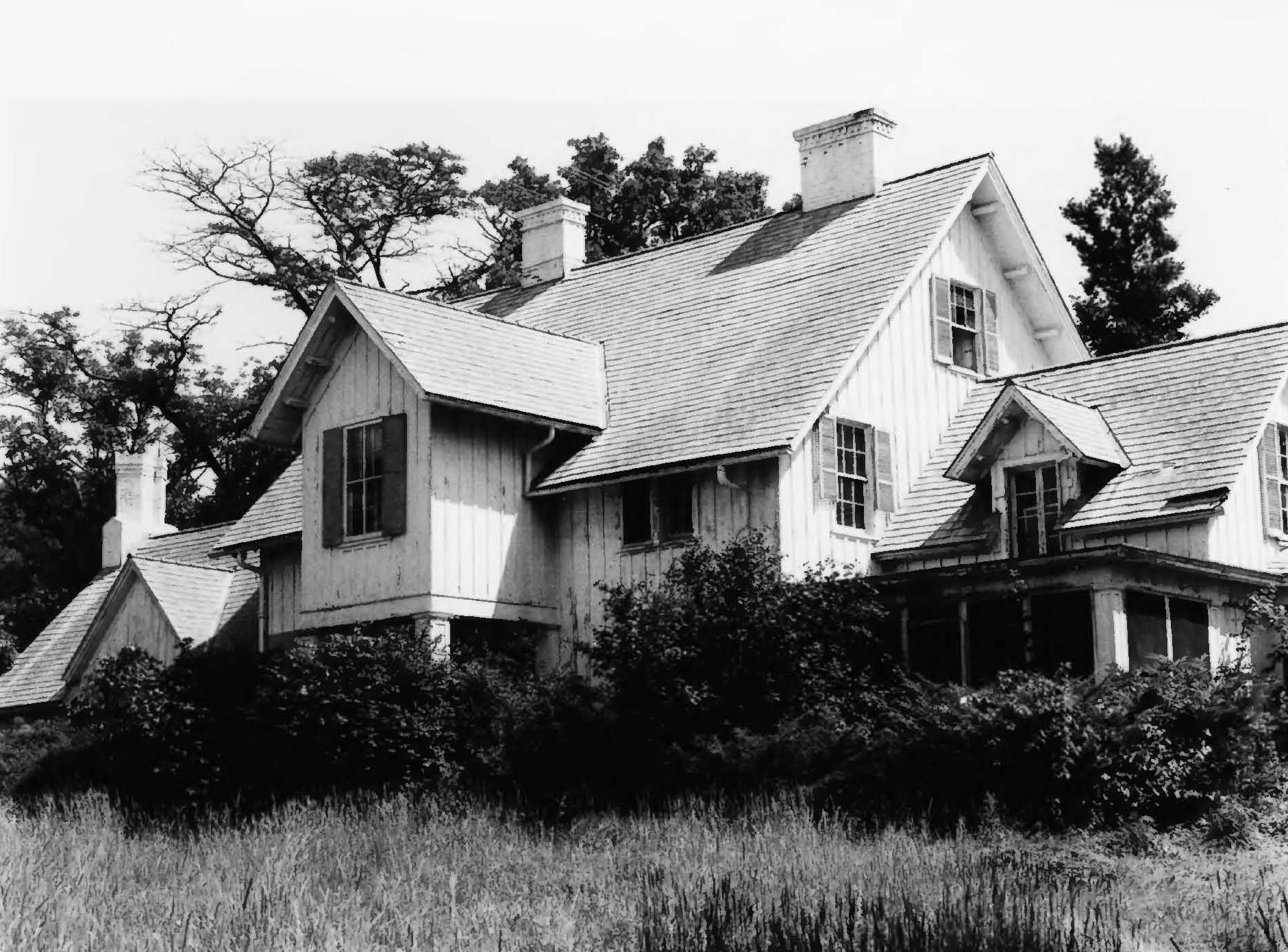
Kennicott house in 1975, shortly after it was donated to the Glenview Park District

In 1973, a real estate group attempted to purchase a portion of The Grove's lands for a residential development project. The prompted the formation of the Save The Grove Committee, who attempted to have the site recognized by the National Park Service (NPS). Their efforts succeeded when the property was listed on the National Register of Historic Places on August 13, 1973. Zenith made a 6-acre (2.4 ha) donation of land to Glenview in July 1974, including the main house. By the next February, Glenview had extended the acquisition with an additional 30 acres (12 ha). The Save the Grove Committee became the Grove Heritage Association in 1976, following recognition of the site by the NPS as a National Historic Landmark on January 7. With $1,000,000 in funds from the state and federal government, another 82 acres (33 ha) were added by the fall of 1979. The last major purchase came in 1995, when another 41 acres (17 ha) were added.

The Grove Heritage Association has led efforts to maintain the property. The original house was restored in 1983 and the schoolhouse followed in 1987. New buildings were added to the campus to improve the educational value: an interpretive nature center was built in 1989 and a replica Potawatomie loghouse opened in 1997. The most recent addition was a fireproof and waterproof archives building to store family papers and artifacts. Approximately 200,000 visit The Grove each year.

== See also ==
- List of National Historic Landmarks in Illinois
- National Register of Historic Places listings in Cook County, Illinois
